= Achaemenid Empire =

Ancient Iranian empire, 550–330 BC

Achaemenid Empire: 𐎧𐏁𐏂 (Old Persian); Xšāça
- 550–330 BC
- Standard of Cyrus the Great (Note: The standard was described as "a golden eagle mounted upon a lofty shaft". This image is from a reconstruction, the design based on an Achaemenid tile from Persepolis, and the coloring based on the Alexander Mosaic, which depicts the standard in dark red and gold.)

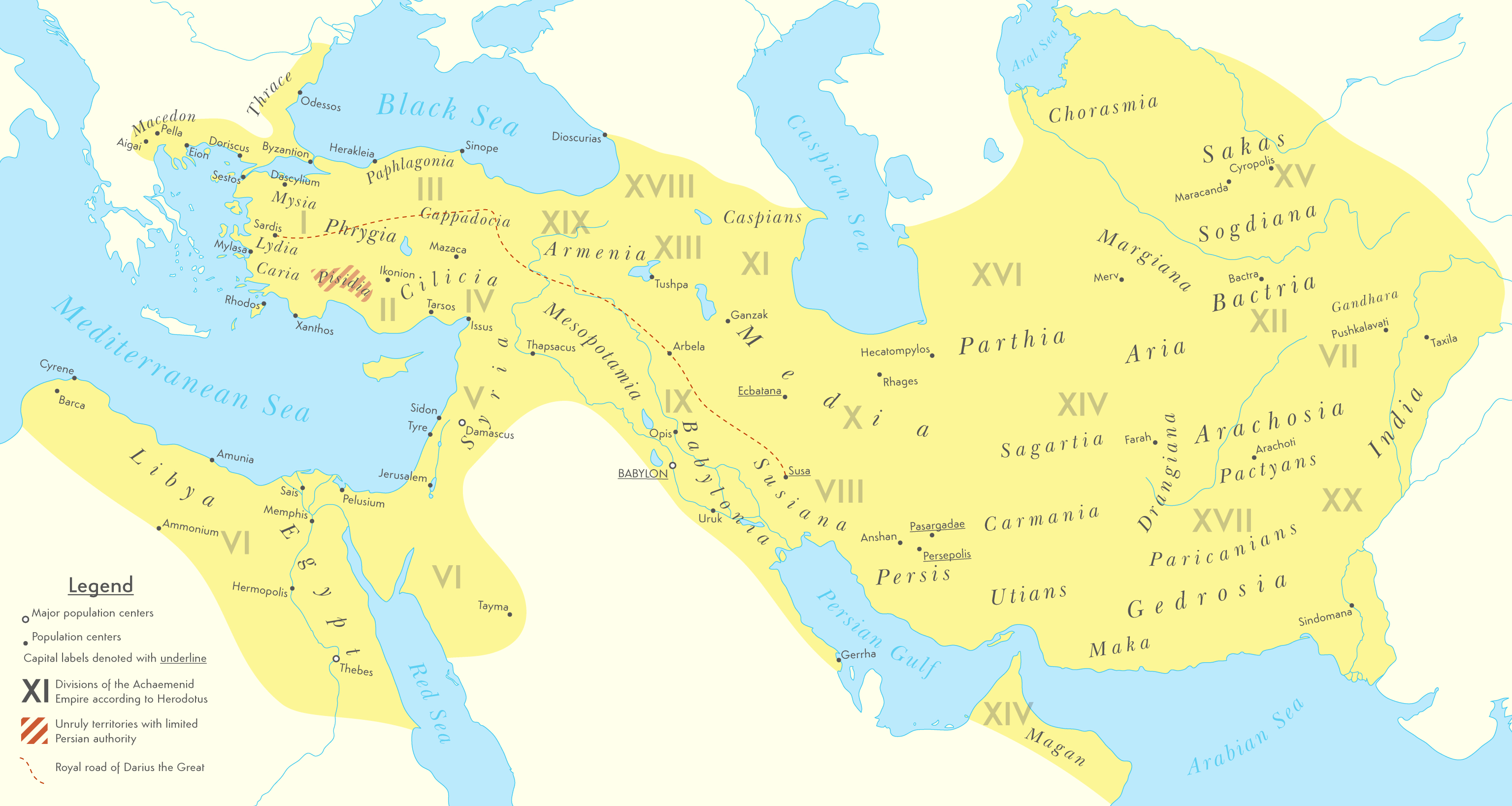
- Map of the Achaemenid Empire's greatest territorial extent, achieved during the reign of Darius the Great (522–486 BC)
- Capital: Babylon; Pasargadae (Cyrus the Great); Ecbatana (ceremonial); Susa (Darius the Great); Persepolis (ceremonial)
- Official languages: Old Persian (dynastic); Aramaic (official, literary, lingua franca)
- Common languages: Akkadian (Note: Literary language in Babylonia.); Elamite; Greek; Median; see § Languages
- Religion: State religion: Zoroastrianism; Others: Mesopotamian religion; Second Temple Judaism; Vedic Hinduism; Egyptian religion; Greek religion; see § Religion
- Government: Monarchy
- Monarchs (Note: Either King (Xšāyaθiya) or King of Kings (Xšāyaθiya xšāyaθiyānām))
  - 559–530 BC: Cyrus the Great
  - 530–522 BC: Cambyses II
  - 522–522 BC: Bardiya
  - 522–486 BC: Darius the Great
  - 486–465 BC: Xerxes I
  - 465–424 BC: Artaxerxes I
  - 424–424 BC: Xerxes II
  - 424–423 BC: Sogdianus
  - 423–405 BC: Darius II
  - 405–358 BC: Artaxerxes II
  - 358–338 BC: Artaxerxes III
  - 338–336 BC: Artaxerxes IV
  - 336–330 BC: Darius III
- Historical era: Classical antiquity
  - Succession to Media: 550 BC
  - Conquest of Lydia: 547 BC
  - Conquest of Babylonia: 539 BC
  - Conquest of the Indus Valley: 535–518 BC
  - Conquest of Egypt: 525 BC
  - Invasion of Scythia: 513 BC
  - Greco-Persian Wars: 499–449 BC
  - Babylonian Revolts: 484 BC
  - Corinthian War: 395–387 BC
  - Great Satraps' Revolt: 372–362 BC
  - Reconquest of Egypt: 343 BC
  - Fall to Macedonia: 330 BC

Area
- 500 BC: 5,500,000 km^{2} (2,100,000 sq mi)

Population
  - 500 BC: 17–35 million
- Currency: Daric; siglos
Preceded by
Persis
Median kingdom
Lydia
Neo-Babylonian Empire
Elam
Sindhu-Sauvīra
Gandhāra (kingdom)
Twenty-sixth Dynasty of Egypt
Macedonia (ancient kingdom)
Succeeded by
Macedonian Empire

The Achaemenid Empire (Note: Also called the Achaemenian Empire, the Persian Empire, Ancient Persia, Old Persia, or the First Persian Empire.) (/əˈkiː.mə.nɪd/, ə-KEE-mə-nid; Old Persian: 𐎧𐏁𐏂, Xšāça, lit. 'The Empire' or 'The Kingdom') was an ancient Iranian empire founded by Cyrus the Great of the Achaemenid dynasty in 550 BC. At peak, its territorial extent was roughly 5.5 million square kilometres (2.1 million square miles), making it the largest empire of its time. Based in the Iranian plateau, it stretched from the Balkans and Cyrenaica in the west to the Indus Valley (Pakistan) in the east, including Anatolia, Cyprus, Mesopotamia, the Levant, the South Caucasus, parts of Eastern Arabia, and large parts of Central Asia.

By the 7th century BC, the region of Persis, located in the southwestern part of the Iranian plateau, had been settled by Persian people. From Persis, Cyrus rose and defeated Media, Lydia, and the Neo-Babylonian Empire, thus marking the establishment of a new imperial polity in the ancient Near East. The empire expanded rapidly, but was repulsed from Scythia in 513 BC and from Greece in 492–490 BC and 480–479 BC.

In 330 BC, amidst a Macedonian military campaign that began in 336 BC, the Achaemenid Empire was conquered in its entirety by Alexander the Great, who annexed it to his Macedonian Empire. Upon Alexander's death, which sparked the beginning of the Hellenistic period in 323 BC, the majority of the former Achaemenid Empire's territories came under the rule of the Seleucid Empire and the Ptolemaic Kingdom. Almost a century later, Iranian elites in the central plateau successfully reclaimed power from the Seleucids and established the Parthian Empire, which existed for nearly half a millennium before being succeeded by the Iranian Sasanian Empire.

In the modern era, the Achaemenid Empire has been recognized for its centralized bureaucracy and administration; its multicultural policy and religious tolerance, especially under Cyrus; its complex infrastructure projects, such as the Royal Road and an organized postal system; the use of official languages (Persian and Aramaic) across its territories; and the development of a civil service and a large, professional army and navy. Many of these systems were adopted and expanded upon by later empires in the Greco-Roman world and beyond.

== Etymology ==
The Achaemenid Empire is named after Achaemenes, who is credited as the progenitor of the Achaemenid dynasty. The term Achaemenid means "of the family of the Achaemenis/Achaemenes" (Old Persian: 𐏃𐎧𐎠𐎶𐎴𐎡𐏁, romanized: Haxāmaniš or Haxūmanišiya a bahuvrihi compound translating to "having a friend's mind"). Achaemenes was himself a minor seventh-century ruler of the Anshan in southwestern Iran, and a vassal of Assyria.

Around 850 BC the original nomadic people who began the empire called themselves the Parsa and their constantly shifting territory Parsua, for the most part localized around Persis. The name "Persia" is a Greek and Latin pronunciation of the native word referring to the country of the people originating from Persis (Old Persian: 𐎱𐎠𐎼𐎿, romanized: Pārsa). The Persian term 𐎧𐏁𐏂 Xšāça, literally meaning "The Kingdom", was used to refer to the Empire formed by their multinational state.

== History ==
=== Timeline ===
Dates are approximate, consult particular article for details

=== Origin of the Achaemenid dynasty ===
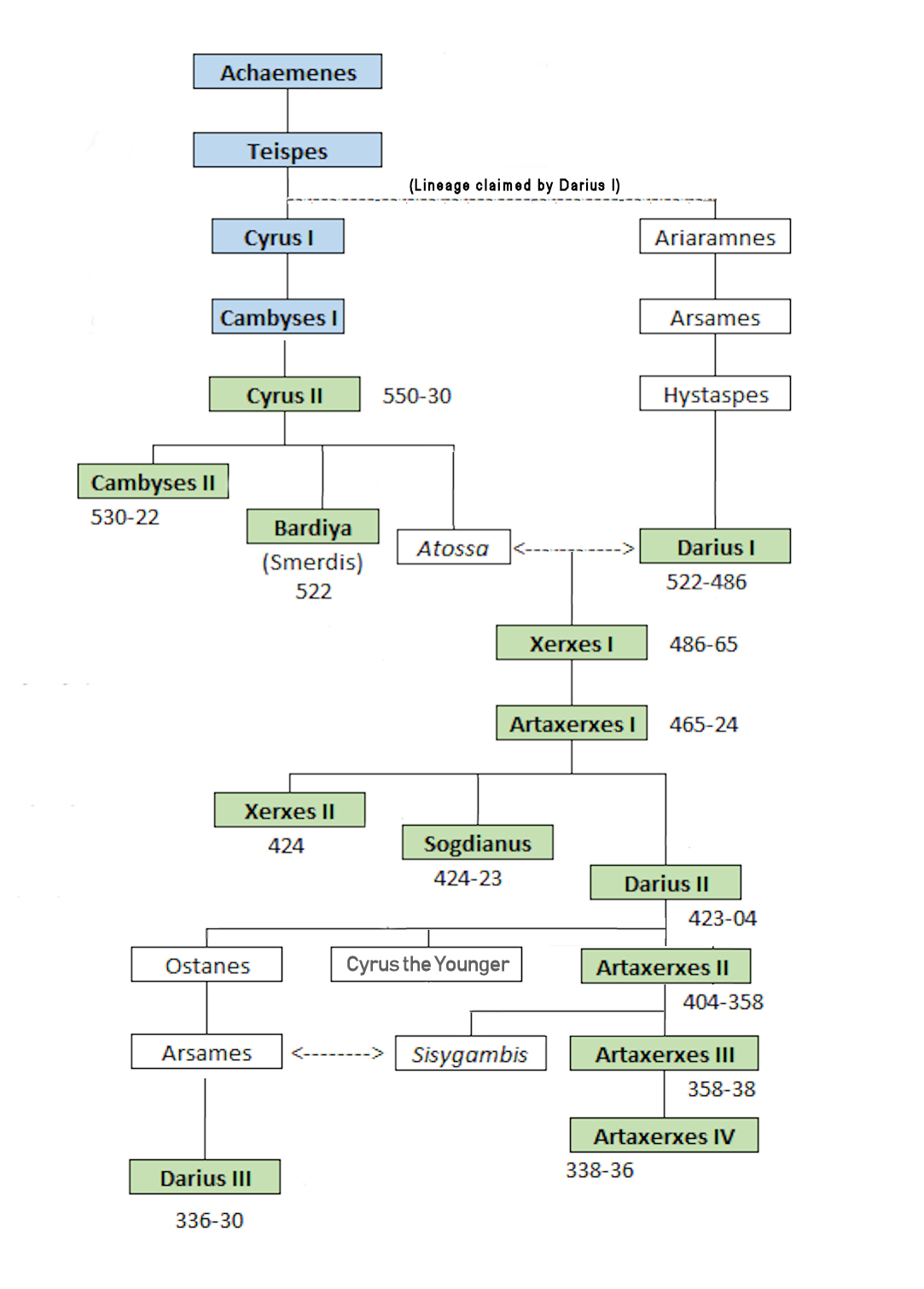
Family tree of the Achaemenid rulers.

The Persian nation contains a number of tribes as listed here. ... : the Pasargadae, Maraphii, and Maspii, upon which all the other tribes are dependent. Of these, the Pasargadae are the most distinguished; they contain the clan of the Achaemenids from which spring the Perseid kings. Other tribes are the Panthialaei, Derusiaei, Germanii, all of which are attached to the soil, the remainder—the Dai, Mardi, Dropici, Sagarti, being nomadic.

— Herodotus, Histories 1.101 & 125

The Achaemenid Empire was founded by nomadic Persians. The Persians were an Iranic people who arrived in what is today Iran c. 1000 BC and settled a region including north-western Iran, the Zagros Mountains and Persis alongside the native Elamites. The Persians were originally nomadic pastoralists in the western Iranian Plateau. The Achaemenid Empire may not have been the first Iranian empire, as the Medes, another group of Iranian people, possibly established a short-lived empire when they played a major role in overthrowing the Assyrians.

The Achaemenids were initially rulers of the Elamite city of Anshan near the modern city of Marvdasht; the title "King of Anshan" was an adaptation of the earlier Elamite title "King of Susa and Anshan". There are conflicting accounts of the identities of the earliest Kings of Anshan. According to the Cyrus Cylinder (the oldest extant genealogy of the Achaemenids) the kings of Anshan were Teispes, Cyrus I, Cambyses I and Cyrus II, also known as Cyrus the Great, who founded the empire.

The later Behistun Inscription, written by Darius the Great, claims that Teispes was the son of Achaemenes and that Darius is also descended from Teispes through a different line, but no earlier texts mention Achaemenes. In Herodotus' Histories, he writes that Cyrus the Great was the son of Cambyses I and Mandane of Media, the daughter of Astyages, the king of the Median Empire.

=== Formation and expansion ===
Achaemenid Empire at greatest extent (orthographic projection)

==== 550s BC ====
Cyrus revolted against the Median Empire in 553 BC, and in 550 BC succeeded in defeating the Medes, capturing Astyages and taking the Median capital city of Ecbatana. Once in control of Ecbatana, Cyrus styled himself as the successor to Astyages and assumed control of the entire empire. By inheriting Astyages' empire, he also inherited the territorial conflicts the Medes had with both Lydia and the Neo-Babylonian Empire.

==== 540s BC ====
King Croesus of Lydia sought to take advantage of the new international situation by advancing into what had previously been Median territory in Asia Minor. Cyrus led a counterattack which not only fought off Croesus' armies, but also led to the capture of Sardis and the fall of the Lydian Kingdom in 546 BC. (Note: The chronology of the reign of Cyrus is uncertain, and these events are alternatively dated in 542–541 BC.) Cyrus placed Pactyes in charge of collecting tribute in Lydia and left, but once Cyrus had left Pactyes instigated a rebellion against Cyrus. Cyrus sent the Median general Mazares to deal with the rebellion, and Pactyes was captured. Mazares, and after his death Harpagus, set about reducing all the cities which had taken part in the rebellion. The subjugation of Lydia took about four years in total.

When the power in Ecbatana changed hands from the Medes to the Persians, many tributaries to the Median Empire believed their situation had changed and revolted against Cyrus. This forced Cyrus to fight wars against Bactria and the nomadic Saka in Central Asia. During these wars, Cyrus established several garrison towns in Central Asia, including the Cyropolis.

==== 530s BC ====
Nothing is known of Persia–Babylon relations between 547 and 539 BC, but it is likely that there were hostilities between the two empires for several years leading up to the war of 540–539 BC and the Fall of Babylon. In October 539 BC, Cyrus won a battle against the Babylonians at Opis, then took Sippar without a fight before finally capturing the city of Babylon on 12 October, where the Babylonian king Nabonidus was taken prisoner.

Upon taking control of the city, Cyrus depicted himself in propaganda as restoring the divine order which had been disrupted by Nabonidus, who had promoted the cult of Sin rather than Marduk, and he also portrayed himself as restoring the heritage of the Neo-Assyrian Empire by comparing himself to the Assyrian king Ashurbanipal. Cyrus is credited with freeing the Jews from the Babylonian captivity, permitting their return to Judah, and authorizing the rebuilding of Jerusalem, including the Second Temple.

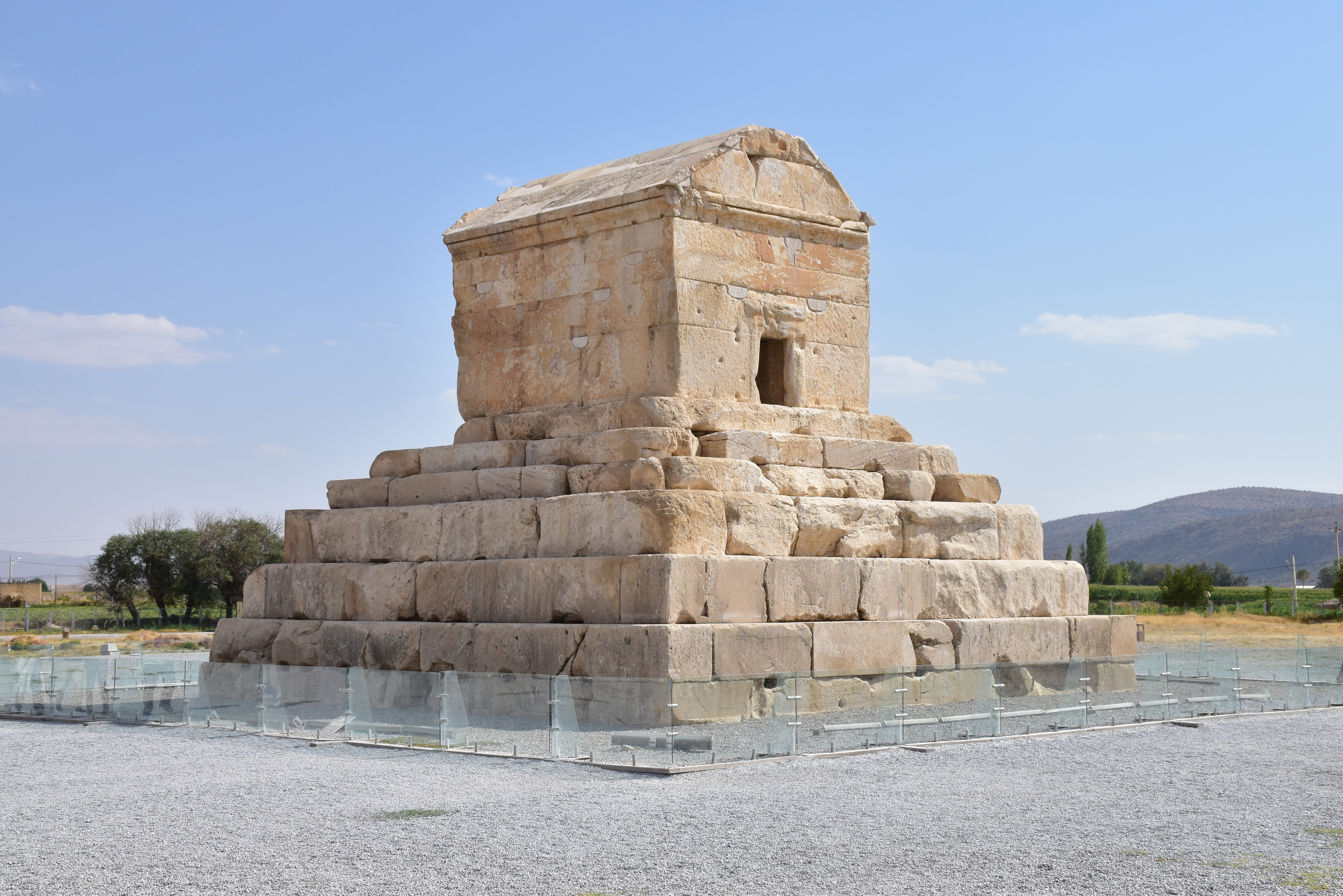
Cyrus the Great's tomb, located at Pasargadae

==== 520s BC ====
In 530 BC, Cyrus died and was succeeded by his eldest son Cambyses II, while his younger son Bardiya (Note: Bardiya is referred to by a variety of names in Greek sources, including Smerdis, Tanyoxarces, Tanoxares, Mergis and Mardos. The earliest account to mention him is the Behistun Inscription, which has his name as Bardiya.) received a large territory in Central Asia. By 525 BC, Cambyses had successfully subjugated Phoenicia and Cyprus and was making preparations to invade Egypt with the newly created Persian navy. Pharaoh Amasis II had died in 526, and had been succeeded by Psamtik III, resulting in the defection of key Egyptian allies to the Persians. Psamtik positioned his army at Pelusium in the Nile Delta. He was soundly defeated by the Persians in the Battle of Pelusium before fleeing to Memphis, where the Persians defeated him and took him prisoner. After attempting a failed revolt, Psamtik III promptly committed suicide.

Herodotus depicts Cambyses as openly antagonistic to the Egyptian people and their gods, cults, temples, and priests, in particular stressing the murder of the sacred bull Apis. He says that these actions led to a madness that caused him to kill his brother Bardiya (who Herodotus says was killed in secret), his own sister-wife and Croesus of Lydia. He then concludes that Cambyses completely lost his mind, and all later classical authors repeat the themes of Cambyses' impiety and madness. However, this is based on spurious information, as the epitaph of Apis from 524 BC shows that Cambyses participated in the funeral rites of Apis styling himself as pharaoh.

Following the conquest of Egypt, the Libyans and the Greeks of Cyrene and Barca in present-day eastern Libya (Cyrenaica) surrendered to Cambyses and sent tribute without a fight. Cambyses then planned invasions of Carthage, the oasis of Ammon and Ethiopia. Herodotus claims that the naval invasion of Carthage was canceled because the Phoenicians, who made up a large part of Cambyses' fleet, refused to take up arms against their own people, but modern historians doubt whether an invasion of Carthage was ever planned at all. However, Cambyses dedicated his efforts to the other two campaigns, aiming to improve the Empire's strategic position in Africa by conquering the Kingdom of Meroë and taking strategic positions in the western oases. To this end, he established a garrison at Elephantine consisting mainly of Jewish soldiers, who remained stationed at Elephantine throughout Cambyses' reign. Herodotus claims that the invasion of Ethiopia was a failure due to the madness of Cambyses and the lack of supplies for his men, but archaeological evidence suggests that the expedition was not a failure, and a fortress at the Second Cataract of the Nile, on the border between Egypt and Kush, remained in use throughout the Achaemenid period. Furthermore, in two inscriptions of Darius, Nubia is listed as one of the lands in the empire, and a Nubian delegation is depicted in Persepolis on the Apadana reliefs which visually present the lands of Darius' empire. These suggest that Cambyses saw success in subduing Nubia.

The events surrounding Cambyses's death and Bardiya's succession are greatly debated as there are many conflicting accounts. According to Herodotus, as Bardiya's assassination had been committed in secret, the majority of Persians still believed him to be alive. This allowed two Magi to rise up against Cambyses, with one of them sitting on the throne able to impersonate Bardiya because of their remarkable physical resemblance and shared name (Smerdis in Herodotus's accounts). Ctesias writes that when Cambyses had Bardiya killed he immediately put the magus Sphendadates in his place as satrap of Bactria due to a remarkable physical resemblance. Two of Cambyses' confidants then conspired to usurp Cambyses and put Sphendadates on the throne under the guise of Bardiya. According to the Behistun Inscription, written by the following king Darius the Great, a magus named Gaumata impersonated Bardiya and incited a revolution in Persia. Whatever the exact circumstances of the revolt, Cambyses heard news of it in the summer of 522 BC and began to return from Egypt, but he was wounded in the thigh in Syria and died of gangrene, so Bardiya's impersonator became king. (Note: Sources differ on the circumstances of Cambyses' death. According to Darius the Great in the Behistun Inscription, he died of natural causes. According to Herodotus, he died after accidentally wounding himself in the thigh. The true cause of death remains uncertain.) Darius provides the earliest account; later historians concur that a magus impersonated Bardiya and seized the throne, but this may be a fabrication by Darius to legitimize his own usurpation. Iranologist Pierre Briant hypothesises that Bardiya was not killed by Cambyses, but waited until his death in the summer of 522 BC to claim his legitimate right to the throne as he was then the only male descendant of the royal family. Briant says that although the hypothesis of a deception by Darius is generally accepted today, "nothing has been established with certainty at the present time, given the available evidence".

The Achaemenid Empire at its greatest extent c. 500 BC

According to the Behistun inscription, Gaumata ruled for seven months before being overthrown in 522 BC by Darius the Great (Old Persian Dāryavuš, "who holds firm the good", also known as Darayarahush). The Magi, though persecuted, continued to exist, and a year following the death of the first pseudo-Smerdis (Gaumata), saw a second pseudo-Smerdis (Vahyazdāta) attempt a coup. The coup, though initially successful, failed.

Herodotus writes that the native leadership debated the best form of government for the empire.

==== 510s BC ====
The Macedonian king Amyntas I surrendered his country to the Persians in about 512–511. In 513, Darius the Great (521–486) initiated Persian military operations that included the subjugation of Macedonia, as a large Achaemenid army invaded the Balkans and tried to defeat the European Scythians north of the Danube. Darius' army subjugated several Thracian peoples and virtually all other regions that touch the European part of the Black Sea, such as parts of modern Bulgaria, Romania, Ukraine, and Russia, before it returned to Asia Minor. Darius left in Europe one of his commanders named Megabazus whose task was to accomplish conquests in the Balkans. The Persian troops subjugated gold-rich Thrace, the coastal Greek cities, and defeated and conquered the powerful Paeonians. Finally, Megabazus sent envoys to Amyntas, demanding acceptance of Persian domination, which the Macedonians did. The Balkans provided many soldiers for the multi-ethnic Achaemenid army. Many of the Macedonian and Persian elite intermarried, such as the Persian official Bubares who married Amyntas' daughter, Gygaea. Family ties that the Macedonian rulers Amyntas and Alexander enjoyed with Bubares ensured them good relations with the Persian kings Darius and Xerxes I, who was also known as Xerxes the Great. The Persian invasion indirectly advanced Macedonia's power, as both shared Balkan interests; Persian aid let Macedonians gain at the expense of tribes like the Paeonians and Greeks. All in all, the Macedonians were "willing and useful Persian allies." Macedonian soldiers fought against Athens and Sparta in Xerxes I's army. The Persians referred to both Greeks and Macedonians as Yauna ("Ionians", their term for "Greeks"), and to Macedonians specifically as Yaunã Takabara or "Greeks with hats that look like shields", possibly referring to the Macedonian kausia hat.

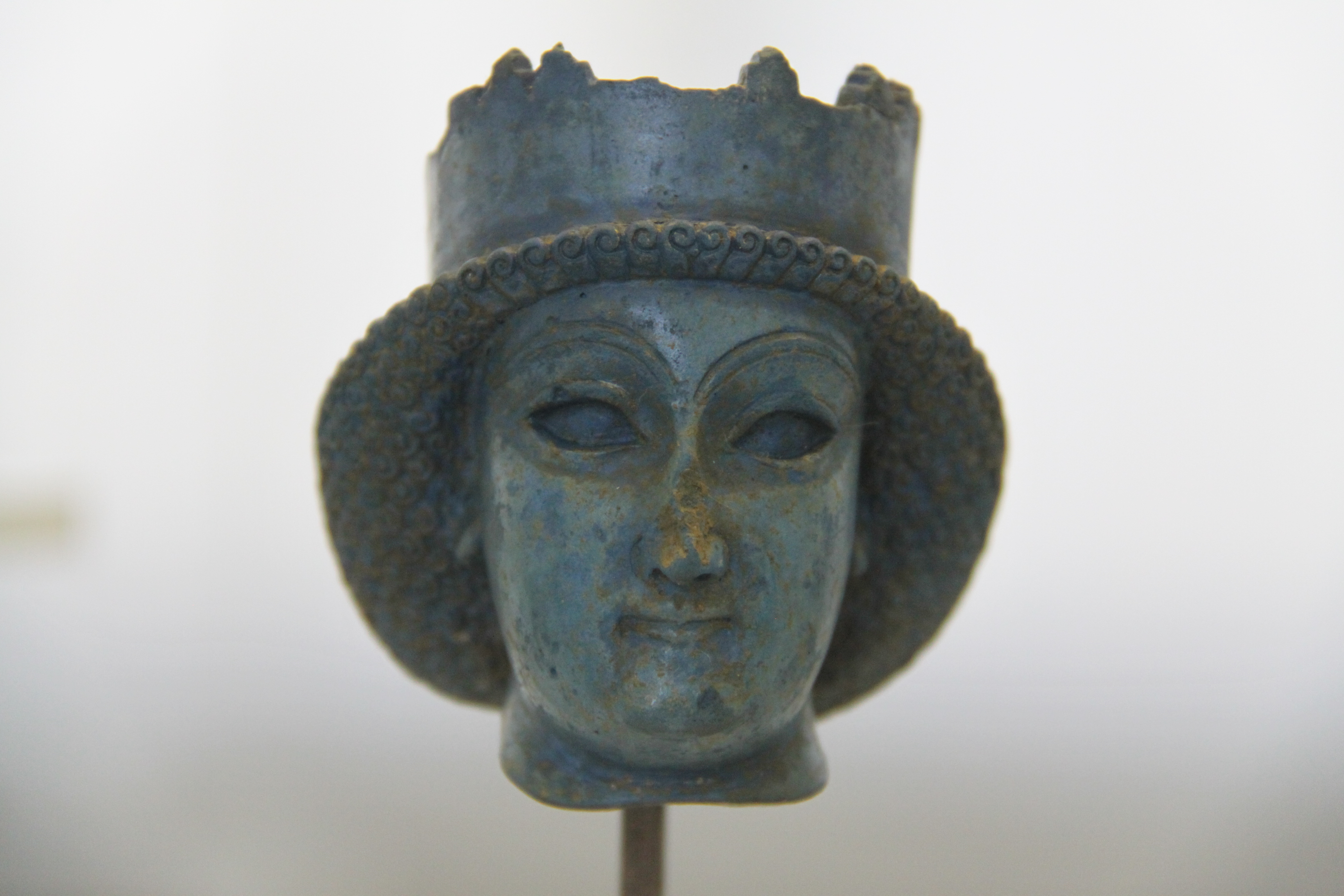
The Persian queen Atossa, daughter of Cyrus the Great, sister-wife of Cambyses II, Darius the Great's wife, and mother of Xerxes the Great

==== 5th century BC ====
By the 5th century BC, the Kings of Persia were either ruling over or had subordinated territories encompassing not just all of the Persian Plateau and all of the territories formerly held by the Assyrian Empire (Mesopotamia, the Levant, Cyprus and Egypt), but beyond this, all of Anatolia and Armenia, as well as the Southern Caucasus and parts of the North Caucasus, Azerbaijan, Uzbekistan, Tajikistan, Bulgaria, Paeonia, Thrace and Macedonia to the north and west, most of the Black Sea coastal regions, parts of Central Asia as far as the Aral Sea, the Oxus and Jaxartes to the north and north-east, the Hindu Kush and the western Indus basin (corresponding to modern Afghanistan and Pakistan) to the far east, parts of northern Arabia to the south, and parts of eastern Libya (Cyrenaica) to the south-west, and parts of Oman, China, and the UAE.

=== Greco-Persian Wars ===
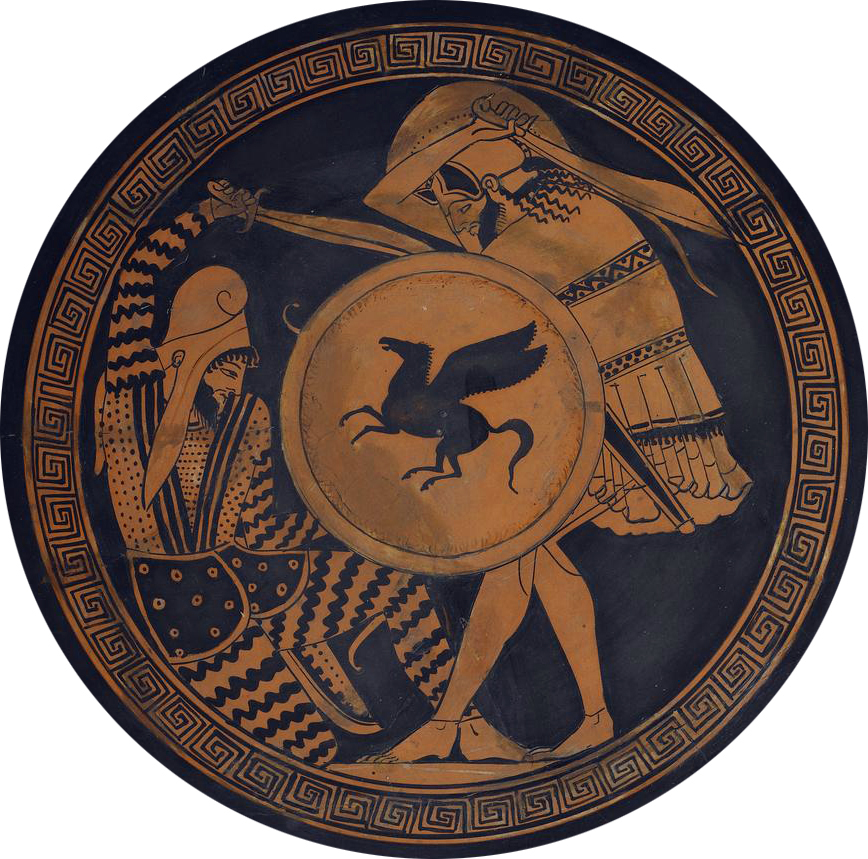
Greek hoplite and Persian warrior depicted fighting, on an ancient kylix, 5th century BC

The Ionian Revolt in 499 BC, and associated revolts in Aeolis, Doris, Cyprus, and Caria, were military rebellions by several regions of Asia Minor against Persian rule, lasting from 499 to 493 BC. At the heart of the rebellion was the dissatisfaction of the Greek cities of Asia Minor with the tyrants appointed by Persia to rule them, along with the individual actions of two Milesian tyrants, Histiaeus and Aristagoras. In 499 BC, the then-tyrant of Miletus, Aristagoras, launched a joint expedition with the Persian satrap Artaphernes to conquer Naxos, in an attempt to bolster his position in Miletus, both financially and in terms of prestige. The mission was a debacle, and sensing his imminent removal as a tyrant, Aristagoras chose to incite the whole of Ionia into rebellion against the Persian king, Darius I, who was commonly known as Darius the Great.

The Persians continued to reduce the cities along the west coast that still held out against them, before finally imposing a peace settlement in 493 BC on Ionia that was generally considered to be both just and fair. The Ionian Revolt constituted the first major conflict between Greece and the Achaemenid Empire, and as such represents the first phase of the Greco-Persian Wars. Asia Minor had been brought back into the Persian fold, but Darius had vowed to punish Athens and Eretria for their support of the revolt. Moreover, seeing that the political situation in Greece posed a continued threat to the stability of his Empire, he decided to embark on the conquest of all of Greece. The first campaign of the invasion was to bring the territories in the Balkan peninsula back within the empire. The Persian grip over these territories had loosened following the Ionian Revolt. In 492 BC, the Persian general Mardonius re-subjugated Thrace and made Macedonia a fully subordinate part of the empire; it had been a vassal as early as the late 6th century BC but retained a great deal of autonomy. However, in 490 BC the Persian forces were defeated by the Athenians at the Battle of Marathon and Darius I would die before having the chance to launch an invasion of Greece.

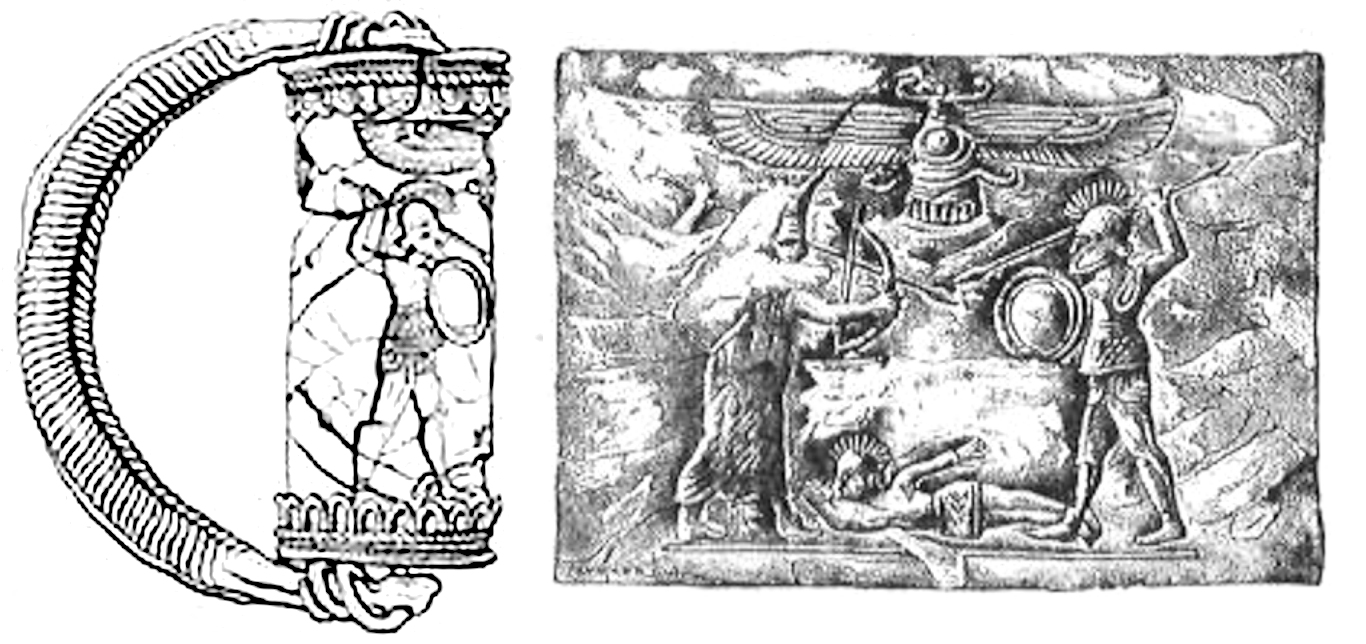
Achaemenid king fighting hoplites, seal and seal holder, Cimmerian Bosporus.

Xerxes I (485–465 BC, Old Persian Xšayārša "Hero Among Kings"), son of Darius I, vowed to complete the job. He organized a massive invasion aiming to conquer Greece. His army entered Greece from the north in the spring of 480 BC, meeting little or no resistance through Macedonia and Thessaly, but was delayed by a small Greek force for three days at Thermopylae. A simultaneous naval battle of Artemisium was tactically indecisive as large storms destroyed ships from both sides. The battle was stopped prematurely when the Greeks received news of the defeat at Thermopylae and retreated. The battle was a tactical victory for the Persians, giving them uncontested control of Artemisium and the Aegean Sea.

Following his victory at the Battle of Thermopylae, Xerxes sacked the evacuated city of Athens and prepared to meet the Greeks at the strategic Isthmus of Corinth and the Saronic Gulf. In 480 BC the Greeks won a decisive victory over the Persian fleet at the Battle of Salamis and forced Xerxes to retire to Sardis. The land army which he left in Greece under Mardonius retook Athens but was eventually destroyed in 479 BC at the Battle of Plataea. The final defeat of the Persians at Mycale encouraged the Greek cities of Asia to revolt, and the Persians lost all of their territories in Europe with Macedonia once again becoming independent. Xerxes was assassinated in his bed, though ancient accounts conflict significantly. The assassination is attributed by Greek and Roman sources to Artabanus, though a Babylonian tablet attributes it to Xerxes' son.

=== Cultural phase and Zoroastrian reforms ===
After Xerxes I was assassinated, he was succeeded by his eldest surviving son Artaxerxes I. It was during his reign that Elamite ceased to be the language of government, and Aramaic gained in importance. It was probably during this reign that the solar calendar was introduced as the national calendar. Under Artaxerxes I, Zoroastrianism became the de facto religion of the empire.

After Persia had been defeated at the Battle of Eurymedon (469 or 466 BC), military action between Greece and Persia was halted. When Artaxerxes I took power, he introduced a new Persian strategy of weakening the Athenians by funding their enemies in Greece. This indirectly caused the Athenians to move the treasury of the Delian League from the island of Delos to the Athenian acropolis. This funding practice inevitably prompted renewed fighting in 450 BC, where the Greeks attacked at the Battle of Cyprus. After Cimon's failure to attain much in this expedition, the Peace of Callias was agreed between Athens, Argos and Persia in 449 BC.

Artaxerxes offered asylum to Themistocles, who was the winner of the Battle of Salamis, after Themistocles was ostracized from Athens. Also, Artaxerxes gave him Magnesia, Myus, and Lampsacus to maintain him in bread, meat, and wine. In addition, Artaxerxes I gave him Palaescepsis to provide him with clothes, and he also gave him Percote with bedding for his house.

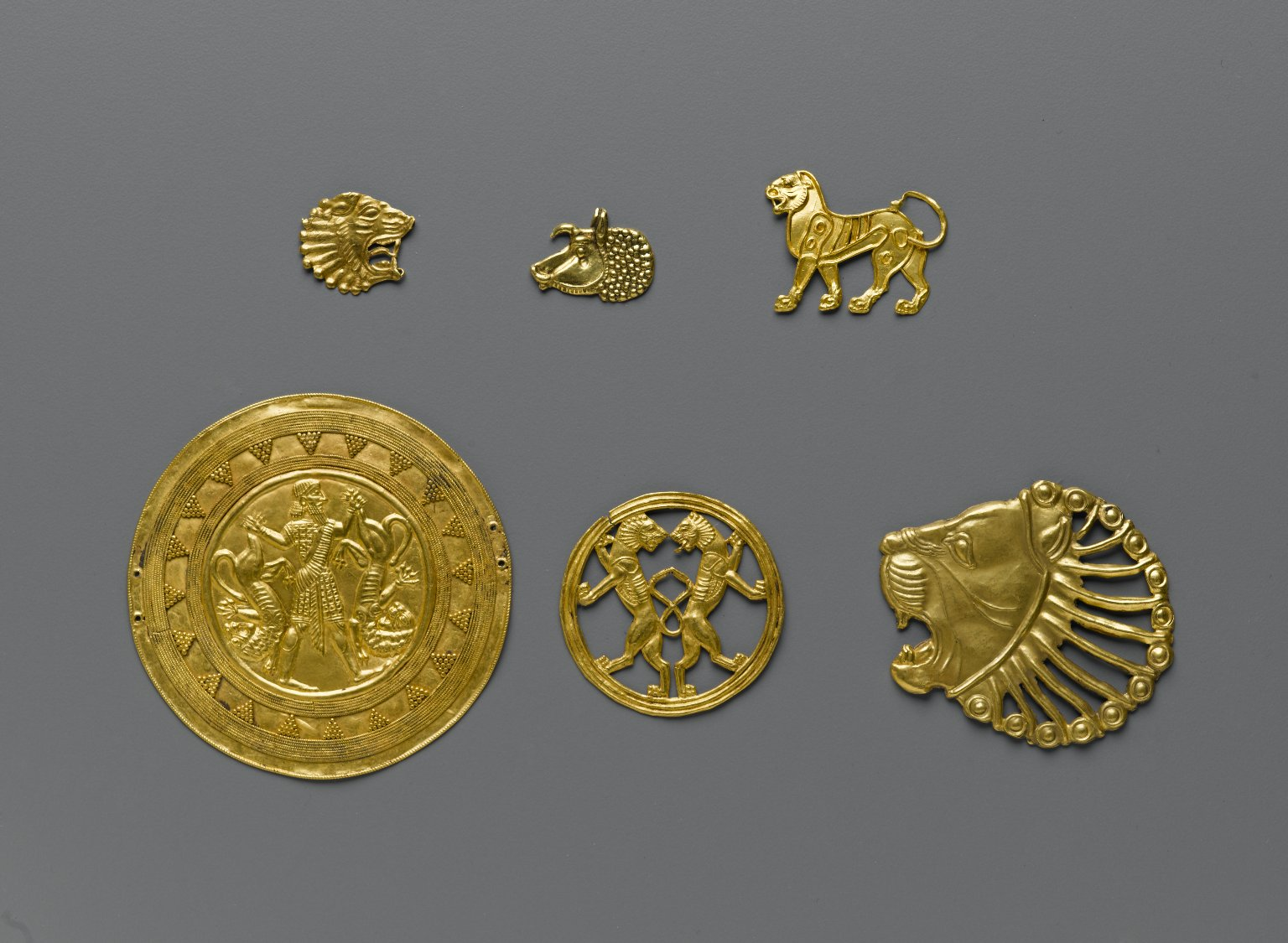
Achaemenid gold ornaments, Brooklyn Museum

When Artaxerxes died in 424 BC at Susa, his body was taken to the tomb already built for him in the Naqsh-e Rustam Necropolis. It was Persian tradition that kings begin constructing their own tombs while they were still alive. Artaxerxes I was immediately succeeded by his eldest and only legitimate son, Xerxes II. However, after a few days on the throne, he was assassinated while drunk by Pharnacyas and Menostanes on the orders of his illegitimate brother Sogdianus, who apparently had gained the support of his regions. Sogdianus reigned for six months and fifteen days before being captured by his half-brother, Ochus, who had rebelled against him. Sogdianus was executed by being suffocated in ash because Ochus had promised he would not die by the sword, by poison or by hunger. Ochus then took the royal name Darius II. Darius' ability to defend his position on the throne ended the short power vacuum.

From 412 BC Darius II, at the insistence of Tissaphernes, gave support first to Athens, then to Sparta, but in 407 BC, Darius' son Cyrus the Younger was appointed to replace Tissaphernes and aid was given entirely to Sparta which finally defeated Athens in 404 BC. In the same year, Darius fell ill and died in Babylon. His death gave an Egyptian rebel named Amyrtaeus the opportunity to throw off Persian control over Egypt. At his death bed, Darius' Babylonian wife Parysatis pleaded with him to have her second eldest son Cyrus (the Younger) crowned, but Darius refused. Queen Parysatis favoured Cyrus more than her eldest son Artaxerxes II. Plutarch relates (probably on the authority of Ctesias) that the displaced Tissaphernes came to the new king on his coronation day to warn him that his younger brother Cyrus (the Younger) was preparing to assassinate him during the ceremony. Artaxerxes had Cyrus arrested and would have had him executed if their mother Parysatis had not intervened. Cyrus was then sent back as Satrap of Lydia, where he prepared an armed rebellion. Cyrus assembled a large army, including a contingent of Ten Thousand Greek mercenaries, and made his way deeper into Persia. The army of Cyrus was stopped by the royal Persian army of Artaxerxes II at Cunaxa in 401 BC, where Cyrus was killed. The Ten Thousand Greek Mercenaries including Xenophon were now deep in Persian territory and were at risk of attack. So they searched for others to offer their services to but eventually had to return to Greece.

Artaxerxes II was the longest reigning of the Achaemenid kings and it was during this 45-year period of relative peace and stability that many of the monuments of the era were constructed. Artaxerxes moved the capital back to Persepolis, which he greatly extended. Also, the summer capital at Ecbatana was lavishly extended with gilded columns and roof tiles of silver and copper. The extraordinary innovation of the Zoroastrian shrines can also be dated to his reign, and it was probably during this period that Zoroastrianism spread from Armenia throughout Asia Minor and the Levant. The construction of temples, though serving a religious purpose, was not a purely selfless act, as they also served as an important source of income. From the Babylonian kings, the Achaemenids adopted the concept of a mandatory temple tax, a one-tenth tithe which all inhabitants paid to the temple nearest to their land or another source of income.

Persian Empire timeline including important events and territorial evolution – 550–323 BC

Artaxerxes II became involved in a war with Persia's erstwhile allies, the Spartans, who, under Agesilaus II, invaded Asia Minor. To redirect the Spartans' attention to Greek affairs, Artaxerxes II subsidized their enemies: in particular the Athenians, Thebans and Corinthians. These subsidies helped to engage the Spartans in what would become known as the Corinthian War. In 387 BC, Artaxerxes II betrayed his allies and came to an arrangement with Sparta, and in the Treaty of Antalcidas he forced his erstwhile allies to come to terms. This treaty restored control of the Greek cities of Ionia and Aeolis on the Anatolian coast to the Persians while giving Sparta dominance on the Greek mainland. In 385 BC he campaigned against the Cadusians. Although successful against the Greeks, Artaxerxes II had more trouble with the Egyptians, who had successfully revolted against him at the beginning of his reign. An attempt to reconquer Egypt in 373 BC was completely unsuccessful, but in his waning years the Persians did manage to defeat a joint Egyptian–Spartan effort to conquer Phoenicia. He quashed the Revolt of the Satraps in 372–362 BC. He is reported to have had a number of wives. His main wife was Stateira, until she was poisoned by Artaxerxes II's mother Parysatis in about 400 BC. Another chief wife was a Greek woman of Phocaea named Aspasia (not the same as the concubine of Pericles). Artaxerxes II is said to have had more than 115 sons from 350 wives.

In 358 BC Artaxerxes II died and was succeeded by his son Artaxerxes III. In 355 BC, Artaxerxes III forced Athens to conclude a peace which required the city's forces to leave Asia Minor and to acknowledge the independence of its rebellious allies. Artaxerxes started a campaign against the rebellious Cadusians, but he managed to appease both of the Cadusian kings. One individual who successfully emerged from this campaign was Darius Codomannus, who later occupied the Persian throne as Darius III.

Artaxerxes III then ordered the disbanding of all the satrapal armies of Asia Minor, as he felt that they could no longer guarantee peace in the west and was concerned that these armies equipped the western satraps with the means to revolt. The order was however ignored by Artabazos II of Phrygia, who asked for the help of Athens in a rebellion against the king. Athens sent assistance to Sardis. Orontes of Mysia also supported Artabazos and the combined forces managed to defeat the forces sent by Artaxerxes III in 354 BC. However, in 353 BC, they were defeated by Artaxerxes III's army and were disbanded. Orontes was pardoned by the king, while Artabazos fled to the safety of the court of Philip II of Macedon. In c. 351 BC, Artaxerxes embarked on a campaign to recover Egypt, which had revolted under his father, Artaxerxes II. At the same time, a rebellion had broken out in Asia Minor, which, being supported by Thebes, threatened to become serious. Levying a vast army, Artaxerxes invaded Egypt and engaged in fighting with Nectanebo II. After a year of fighting the Egyptian Pharaoh, Nectanebo inflicted a crushing defeat on the Persians with the support of mercenaries led by the Greek generals Diophantus and Lamius. Artaxerxes was compelled to retreat and postpone his plans to reconquer Egypt. Soon after this defeat, there were rebellions in Phoenicia, Asia Minor and Cyprus.

Darius vase

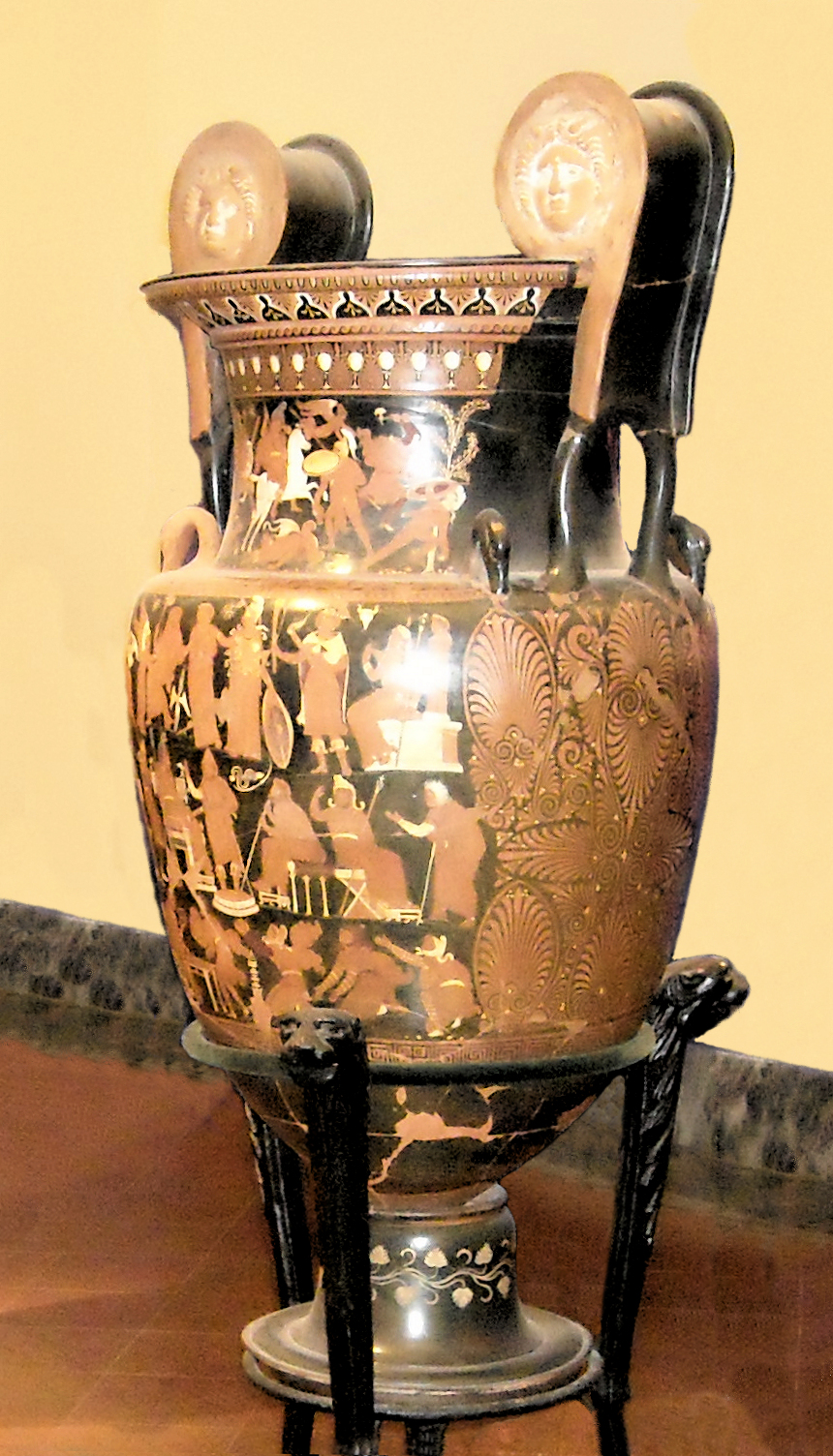
The Darius Vase at the Archaeological Museum of Naples. c. 340–320 BC.

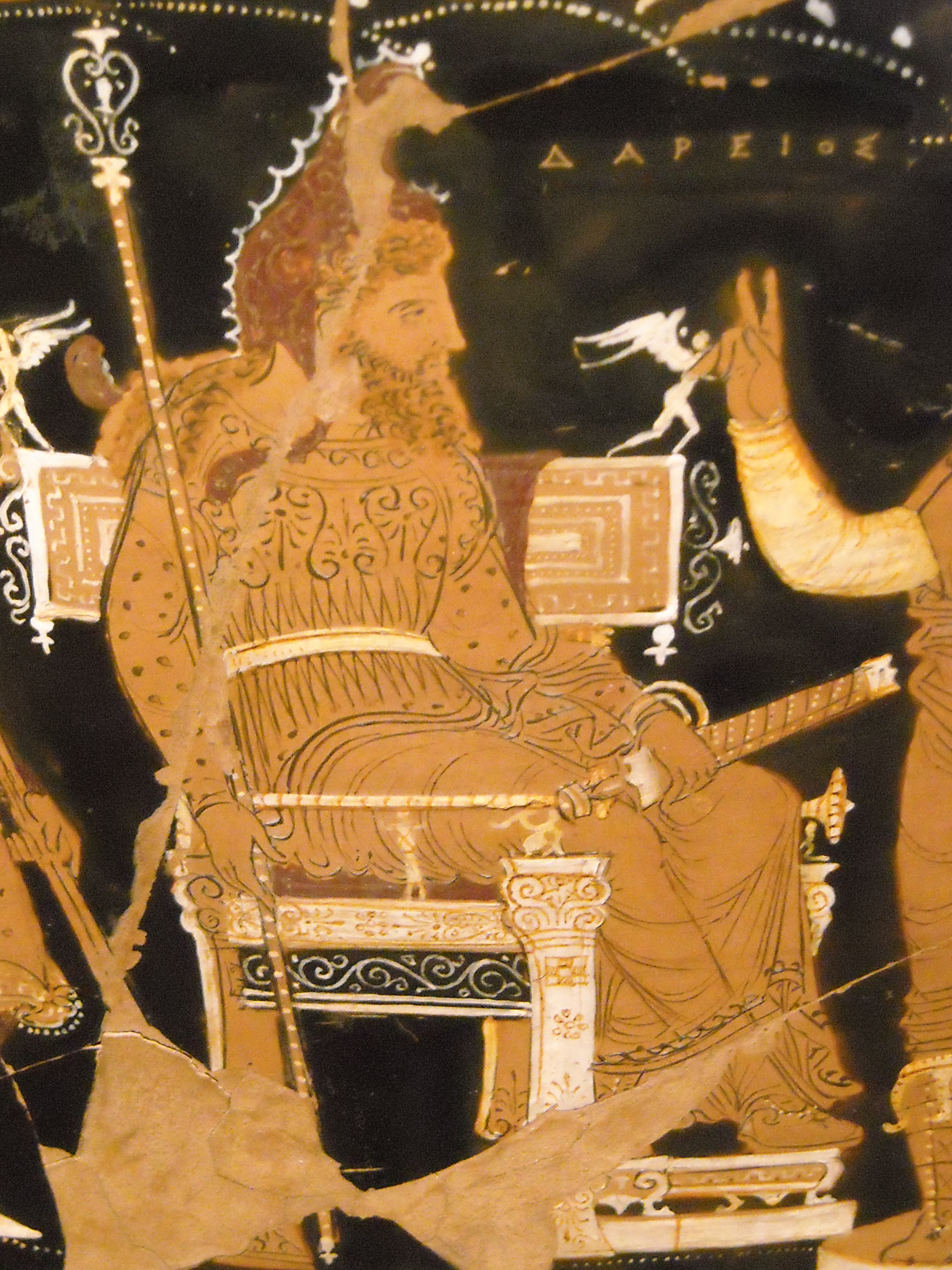
Detail of Darius, with a label in Greek (ΔΑΡΕΙΟΣ, top right) giving his name.

In 343 BC, Artaxerxes committed responsibility for the suppression of the Cyprian rebels to Idrieus, prince of Caria, who employed 8,000 Greek mercenaries and forty triremes, commanded by Phocion the Athenian, and Evagoras, son of the elder Evagoras, the Cypriot monarch. Idrieus succeeded in reducing Cyprus. Artaxerxes initiated a counter-offensive against Sidon by commanding Belesys II, satrap of Syria, and Mazaeus, satrap of Cilicia, to invade the city and to keep the Phoenicians in check. Both satraps suffered crushing defeats at the hands of Tennes, the Sidonese king, who was aided by 40,000 Greek mercenaries sent to him by Nectanebo II and commanded by Mentor of Rhodes. As a result, the Persian forces were driven out of Phoenicia.

After this, Artaxerxes personally led an army of 330,000 men against Sidon. Artaxerxes' army comprised 300,000-foot soldiers, 30,000 cavalry, 300 triremes, and 500 transports or provision ships. After gathering this army, he sought assistance from the Greeks. Though refused aid by Athens and Sparta, he succeeded in obtaining a thousand Theban heavy-armed hoplites under Lacrates, three thousand Argives under Nicostratus, and six thousand Æolians, Ionians, and Dorians from the Greek cities of Asia Minor. This Greek support was numerically small, amounting to no more than 10,000 men, but it formed, together with the Greek mercenaries from Egypt who went over to him afterward, the force on which he placed his chief reliance, and to which the ultimate success of his expedition was mainly due. The approach of Artaxerxes sufficiently weakened the resolution of Tennes that he endeavoured to purchase his own pardon by delivering up 100 principal citizens of Sidon into the hands of the Persian king and then admitting Artaxerxes within the defences of the town. Artaxerxes had the 100 citizens transfixed with javelins, and when 500 more came out as supplicants to seek his mercy, Artaxerxes consigned them to the same fate. Sidon was then burnt to the ground, either by Artaxerxes or by the Sidonian citizens. Forty thousand people died in the conflagration. Artaxerxes sold the ruins at a high price to speculators, who calculated on reimbursing themselves by the treasures which they hoped to dig out from among the ashes. Tennes was later put to death by Artaxerxes. Artaxerxes later sent Jews who supported the revolt to Hyrcania on the south coast of the Caspian Sea.

=== Second conquest of Egypt ===
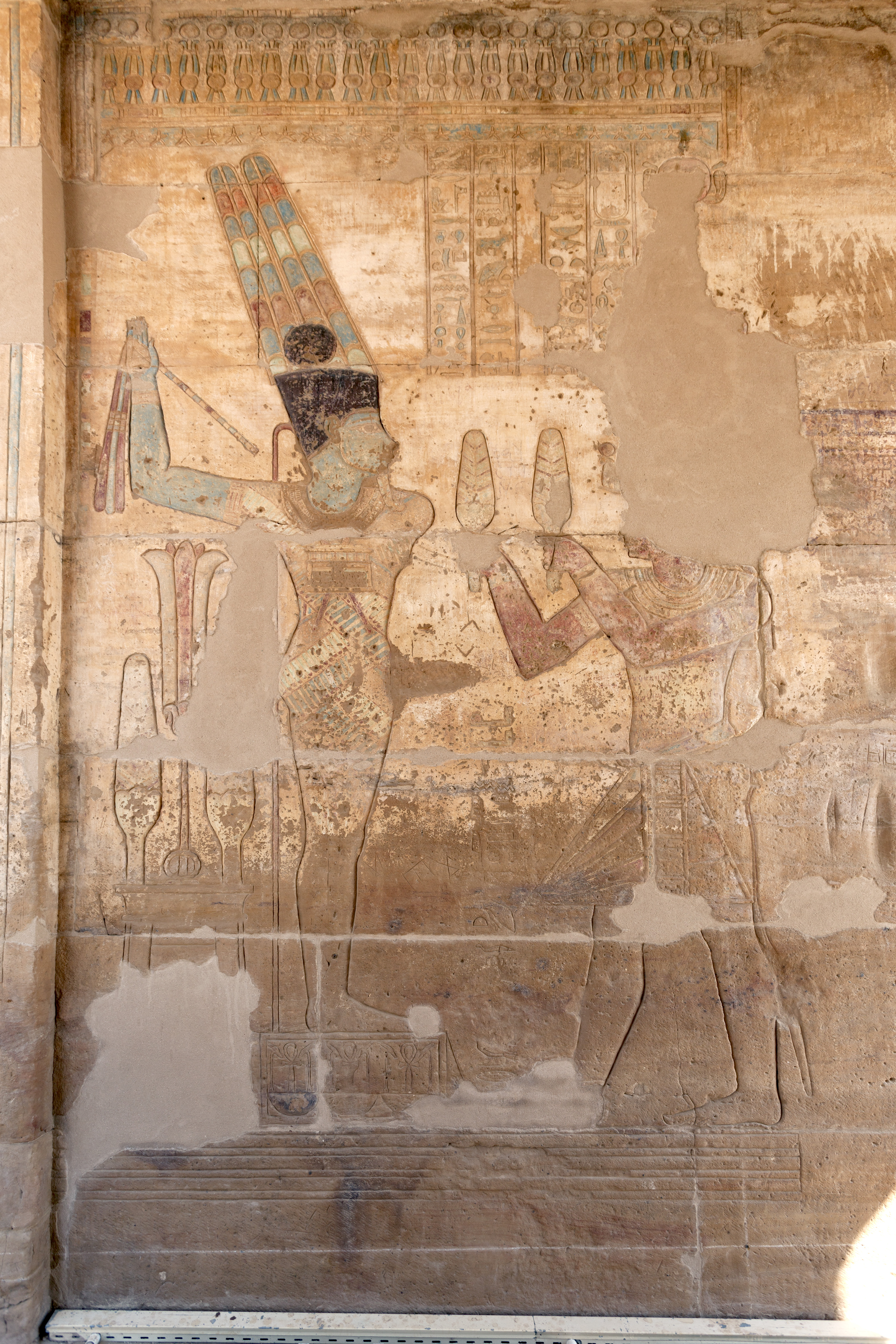
Relief showing Darius I offering lettuces to the Egyptian deity Amun-Ra Kamutef, Temple of Hibis

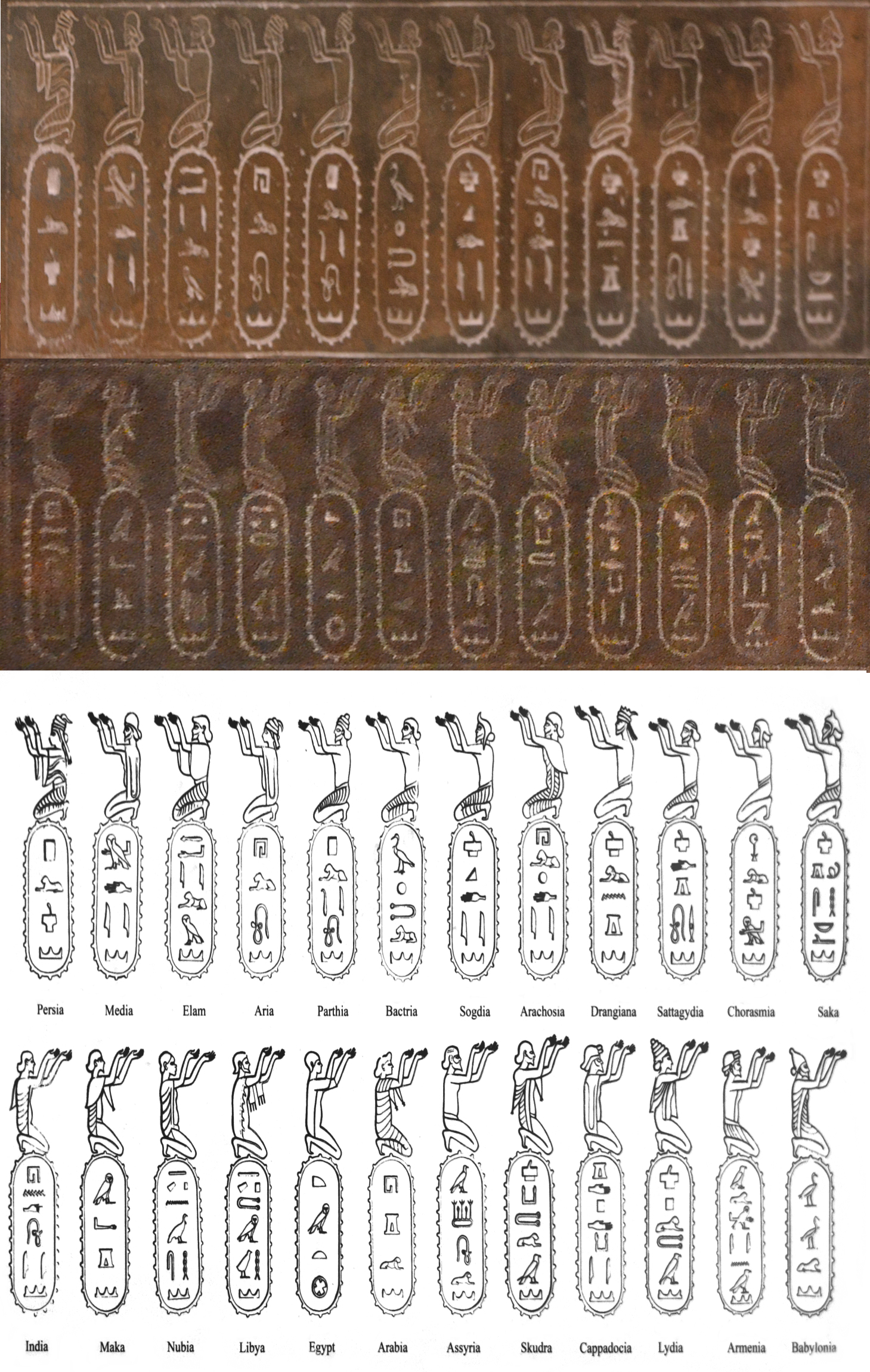
The 24 countries subject to the Achaemenid Empire at the time of Darius, on the Egyptian statue of Darius I.

The reduction of Sidon was followed closely by the invasion of Egypt. In 343 BC, Artaxerxes III, in addition to his 330,000 Persians, had now a force of 14,000 Greeks furnished by the Greek cities of Asia Minor: 4,000 under Mentor of Rhodes, consisting of the troops that he had brought to the aid of Tennes from Egypt; 3,000 sent by Argos; and 1,000 from Thebes. He divided these troops into three bodies, and placed at the head of each a Persian and a Greek. The Greek commanders were Lacrates of Thebes, Mentor of Rhodes and Nicostratus of Argos while the Persians were led by Rhossaces, Aristazanes, and Bagoas, the chief of the eunuchs. Nectanebo II resisted with an army of 100,000 of whom 20,000 were Greek mercenaries. Nectanebo II occupied the Nile and its various branches with his navy.

The character of the country, intersected by numerous canals and full of strongly fortified towns, was in his favour and Nectanebo II might have been expected to offer a prolonged, if not even a successful resistance. However, he lacked good generals, and, over-confident in his own powers of command, he was out-maneuvered by the Greek mercenary generals, and his forces were eventually defeated by the combined Persian armies. After his defeat, Nectanebo hastily fled to Memphis, leaving the fortified towns to be defended by their garrisons. These garrisons consisted of partly Greek and partly Egyptian troops; between whom jealousies and suspicions were easily sown by the Persian leaders. As a result, the Persians were able to rapidly reduce numerous towns across Lower Egypt and were advancing upon Memphis when Nectanebo decided to quit the country and flee southwards to Ethiopia. The Persian army completely routed the Egyptians and occupied the Lower Delta of the Nile. Following Nectanebo fleeing to Ethiopia, all of Egypt submitted to Artaxerxes. The Jews in Egypt were sent either to Babylon or to Hyrcania, the region on the south coast of the Caspian Sea.

After this victory over the Egyptians, Artaxerxes had the city walls destroyed, started a reign of terror, and set about looting all the temples. Persia gained a significant amount of wealth from this looting. Artaxerxes also raised high taxes and attempted to weaken Egypt enough that it could never revolt against Persia. For the 10 years that Persia controlled Egypt, believers in the native religion were persecuted and sacred books were stolen. Before Artaxerxes returned to Persia, he appointed Pherendares as satrap of Egypt. With the wealth gained from his reconquering Egypt, Artaxerxes was able to amply reward his mercenaries. He then returned to his capital having successfully completed his invasion of Egypt.

After his success in Egypt, Artaxerxes returned to Persia and spent the next few years quelling insurrections in various parts of the Empire, after which it was firmly under his control. Egypt remained a part of the Persian Empire from then until Alexander the Great's conquest of Egypt.

After the conquest of Egypt, there were no more revolts or rebellions against Artaxerxes. Mentor and Bagoas, the two generals who had most distinguished themselves in the Egyptian campaign, were advanced to posts of the highest importance. Mentor, who was governor of the entire Asiatic seaboard, was successful in reducing to subjection many of the chiefs who during the recent troubles had rebelled against Persian rule. In the course of a few years, Mentor and his forces were able to bring the whole Asian Mediterranean coast into complete submission and dependence.

Bagoas went back to the Persian capital with Artaxerxes, where he took a leading role in the internal administration of the Empire and maintained tranquillity throughout the rest of the Empire. During the last six years of the reign of Artaxerxes III, the Persian Empire was governed by a vigorous and successful government.

The Persian forces in Ionia and Lycia regained control of the Aegean and the Mediterranean Sea and took over much of Athens' former island empire. In response, Isocrates of Athens started giving speeches calling for a 'crusade against the barbarians' but there was not enough strength left in any of the Greek city-states to answer his call.

Although there were no rebellions in the Persian Empire itself, the growing power and territory of Philip II of Macedon in Macedon (against which Demosthenes was in vain warning the Athenians) attracted the attention of Artaxerxes. In response, he ordered that Persian influence was to be used to check and constrain the rising power and influence of the Macedonian kingdom. In 340 BC, a Persian force was dispatched to assist the Thracian prince, Cersobleptes, to maintain his independence. Sufficient effective aid was given to the city of Perinthus that the numerous and well-appointed army with which Philip had commenced his siege of the city was compelled to give up the attempt. By the last year of Artaxerxes' rule, Philip II already had plans in place for an invasion of the Persian Empire, which would crown his career, but the Greeks would not unite with him.

In 338 BC Artaxerxes was poisoned by Bagoas with the assistance of a physician.

=== Fall to Alexander III of Macedon ===
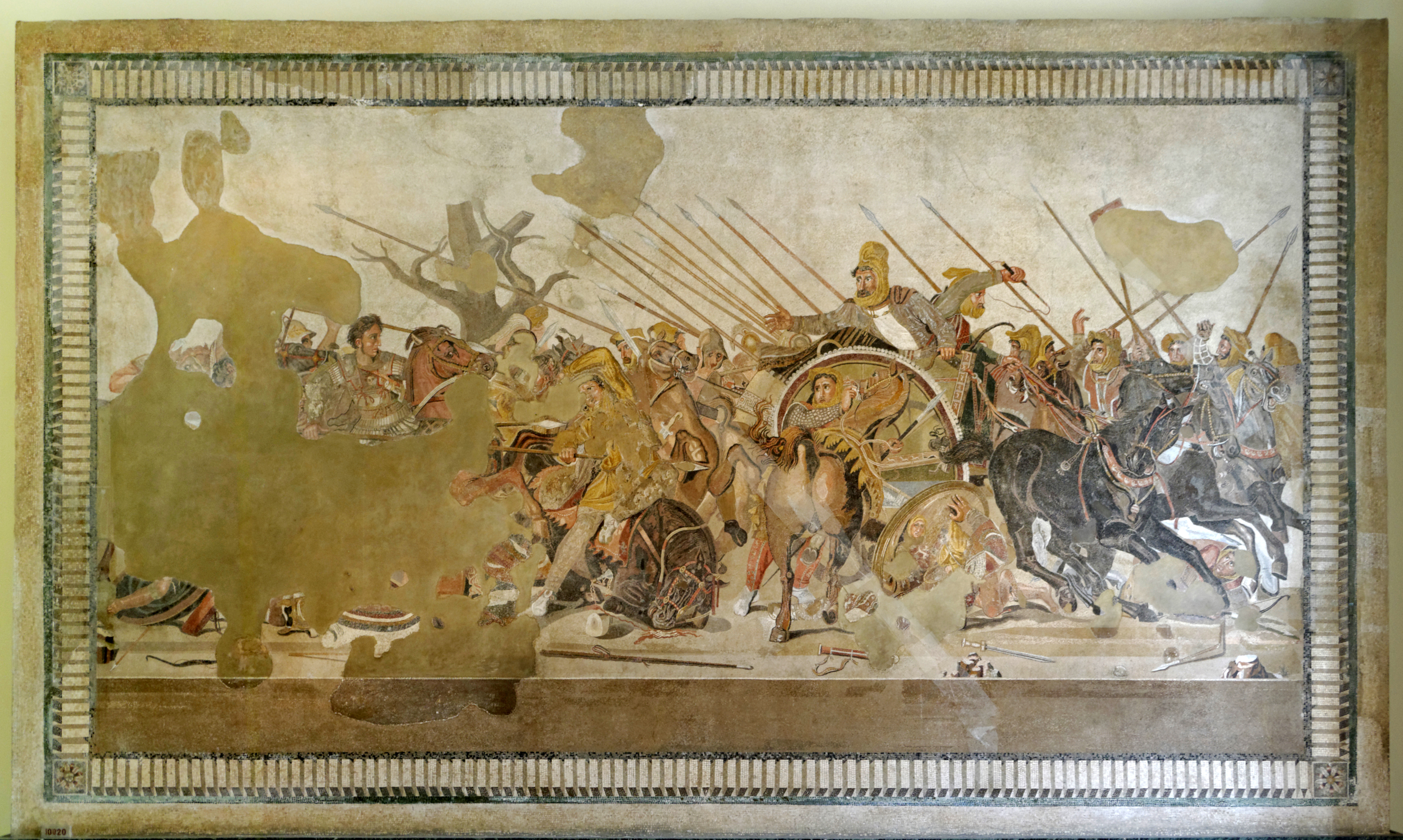
The Battle of Issus, between Alexander the Great on horseback to the left, and Darius III in the chariot to the right, represented in a Pompeii mosaic dated 1st century BC – Naples National Archaeological Museum

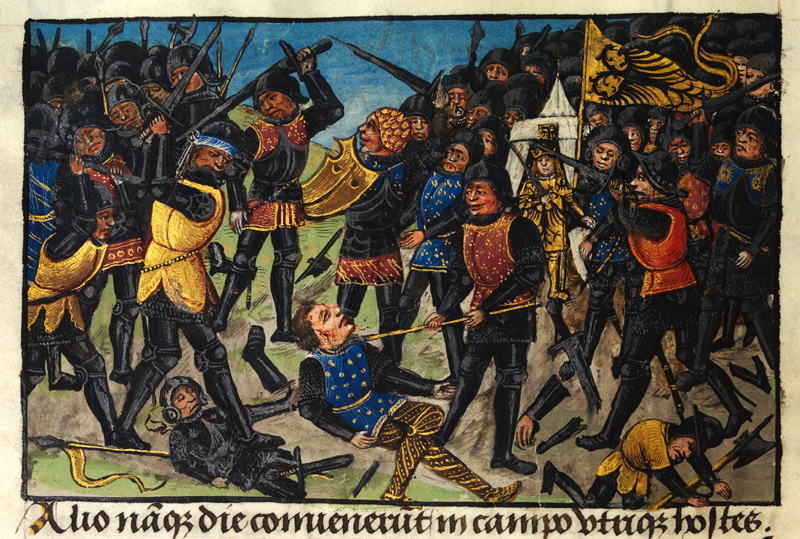
Alexander's first victory over Darius, the Persian king depicted in medieval European style in the 15th century romance The History of Alexander's Battles

Artaxerxes III was succeeded by Artaxerxes IV Arses, who before he could act was also poisoned by Bagoas. Bagoas is further said to have killed not only all Arses' children, but many of the other princes of the land. Bagoas then placed Darius III, a nephew of Artaxerxes IV, on the throne. Darius III, previously the Satrap of Armenia, personally forced Bagoas to swallow poison. In 334 BC, when Darius was just succeeding in subduing Egypt again, Alexander and his battle-hardened troops invaded Asia Minor.

Alexander the Great (Alexander III of Macedon) defeated the Persian armies at Granicus (334 BC), followed by Issus (333 BC), and lastly at Gaugamela (331 BC). Afterwards, he marched on Susa and Persepolis which surrendered and was destroyed by fire in early 330 BC. From Persepolis, Alexander headed north to Pasargadae, where he visited the tomb of Cyrus, the man whom he had heard of from the Cyropaedia.

In the ensuing chaos created by Alexander's invasion of Persia, Cyrus's tomb was broken into and most of its luxuries were looted. When Alexander reached the tomb, he was horrified by the manner in which it had been treated, and questioned the Magi, putting them on trial. By some accounts, Alexander's decision to put the Magi on trial was more an attempt to undermine their influence and display his own power than a show of concern for Cyrus's tomb. Regardless, Alexander the Great ordered Aristobulus to improve the tomb's condition and restore its interior, showing respect for Cyrus. From there he headed to Ecbatana, where Darius III had sought refuge.

Darius III was taken prisoner by Bessus, his Bactrian satrap and kinsman. As Alexander approached, Bessus had his men murder Darius III and then declared himself Darius' successor, as Artaxerxes V, before retreating into Central Asia leaving Darius' body in the road to delay Alexander, who brought it to Persepolis for an honourable funeral. Bessus would then create a coalition of his forces, to create an army to defend against Alexander. Before Bessus could fully unite with his confederates at the eastern part of the empire, Alexander, fearing the danger of Bessus gaining control, found him, put him on trial in a Persian court under his control, and ordered his execution in a "cruel and barbarous manner."

Alexander generally kept the original Achaemenid administrative structure, leading some scholars to dub him as "the last of the Achaemenids". Upon Alexander's death in 323 BC, his empire was divided among his generals, the Diadochi, resulting in a number of smaller states. The largest of these, which held sway over the Iranian plateau, was the Seleucid Empire, ruled by Alexander's general Seleucus I Nicator. Native Iranian rule would be restored by the Parthians of northeastern Iran over the course of the 2nd century BC through the Parthian Empire.

=== Descendants in later Persian dynasties ===
"Frataraka" of the Seleucid Empire

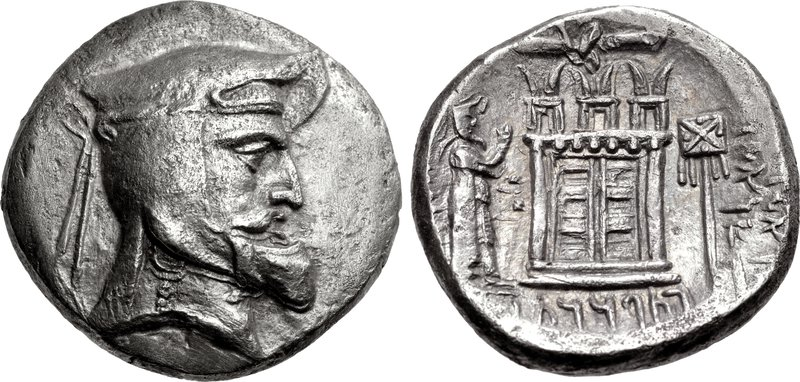
Frataraka dynasty ruler Vadfradad I (Autophradates I). 3rd century BC. Istakhr (Persepolis) mint.

Several later Persian rulers, forming the Frataraka dynasty, are known to have acted as representatives of the Seleucids in the region of Fārs. They ruled from the end of the 3rd century BC to the beginning of the 2nd century BC, and Vahbarz or Vādfradād I obtained independence c. 150 BC, when Seleucid power waned in the areas of southwestern Persia and the Persian Gulf region.

Kings of Persis under the Parthian Empire

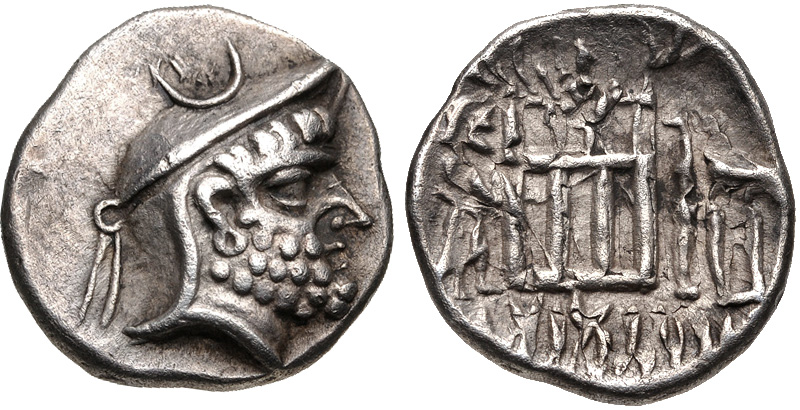
Dārēv I (Darios I) used for the first time the title of mlk (King). 2nd century BC.

During an apparent transitional period, corresponding to the reigns of Vādfradād II and another uncertain king, no titles of authority appeared on the reverse of their coins. The earlier title prtrk' zy alhaya (Frataraka) had disappeared. Under Dārēv I (Darios I) however, the new title of mlk, or king, appeared, sometimes with the mention of prs (Persis), suggesting that the kings of Persis had become independent rulers.

When the Parthian Arsacid king Mithridates I (c. 171–138 BC) took control of Persis, he left the Persian dynasts in office, known as the Kings of Persis, and they were allowed to continue minting coins with the title of mlk ("King").

Sasanian Empire

With the reign of Šābuhr, the son of Pāpag, the kingdom of Persis then became a part of the Sasanian Empire. Šābuhr's brother and successor, Ardaxšir (Artaxerxes) V, defeated the last legitimate Parthian king, Artabanos V in 224 AD, and was crowned at Ctesiphon as Ardaxšir I (Ardashir I), šāhanšāh ī Ērān, becoming the first king of the new Sasanian Empire.

Kingdom of Pontus

The Achaemenid line would also be carried on through the Kingdom of Pontus, based in the Pontus region of northern Asia Minor. This Pontic Kingdom, a state of Persian origin, may even have been directly related to Darius I and the Achaemenid dynasty. It was founded by Mithridates I in 281 BC and lasted until its conquest by the Roman Republic in 63 BC. The kingdom grew to its largest extent under Mithridates VI the Great, who conquered Colchis, Cappadocia, Bithynia, the Greek colonies of the Tauric Chersonesos and for a brief time the Roman province of Asia. Thus, this Persian dynasty managed to survive and prosper in the Hellenistic world while the main Persian Empire had fallen. Despite Greek influence on the Kingdom of Pontus, Pontics continued to maintain their Achaemenid lineage.

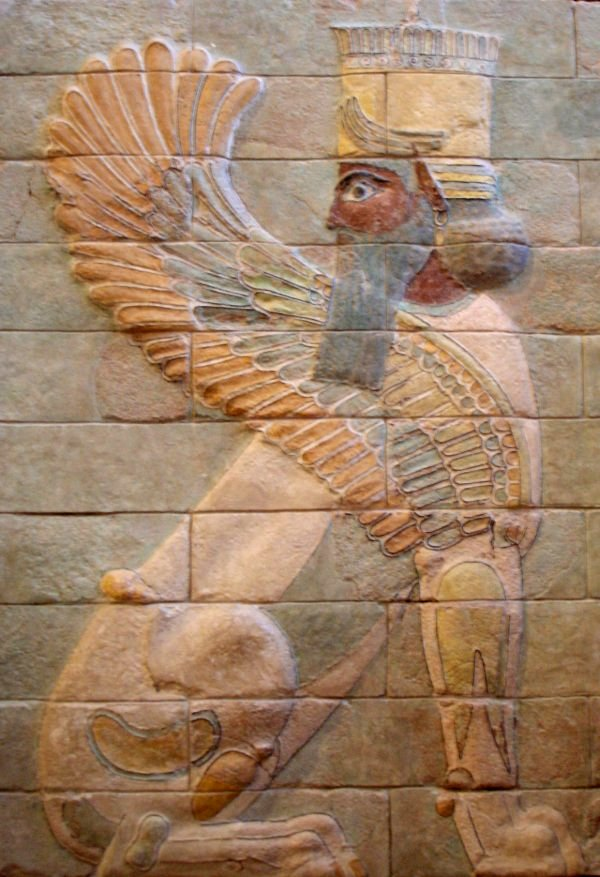
Winged sphinx from the Palace of Darius in Susa, Louvre museum

Both the later dynasties of the Parthians and Sasanians would on occasion claim Achaemenid descent. Recently there has been some corroboration for the Parthian claim to Achaemenid ancestry via the possibility of an inherited disease (neurofibromatosis) demonstrated by the physical descriptions of rulers and from the evidence of familial disease on ancient coinage.

== Government ==
Cyrus the Great founded the empire as a multi-state empire, governed from four capital cities: Pasargadae, Babylon, Susa and Ecbatana. The Achaemenids allowed a certain amount of regional autonomy in the form of the satrapy system. A satrapy was an administrative unit, usually organized on a geographical basis. A 'satrap' (governor) was the governor who administered the region, a 'general' supervised military recruitment and ensured order, and a 'state secretary' kept the official records. The general and the state secretary reported directly to the satrap as well as the central government. At differing times, there were between 20 and 30 satrapies.

Cyrus the Great created an organized army including the Immortals unit, consisting of 10,000 highly trained soldiers Cyrus also formed an innovative postal system throughout the empire, based on several relay stations called Chapar Khaneh.

Persepolis Administrative Archives provide many insights into the Achaemenid government system. Found at Persepolis in the 1930s, they are mostly in Elamite; the remains of more than 10,000 of these cuneiform documents have been uncovered. Aramaic is represented by about 1,000 or more original records. Only one tablet in Old Persian has been identified so far.

Also, many seals and seal impressions are found in these Persepolis archives. These documents represent administrative activity and flow of data in Persepolis over more than fifty consecutive years (509–457 BC).

=== Coinage ===
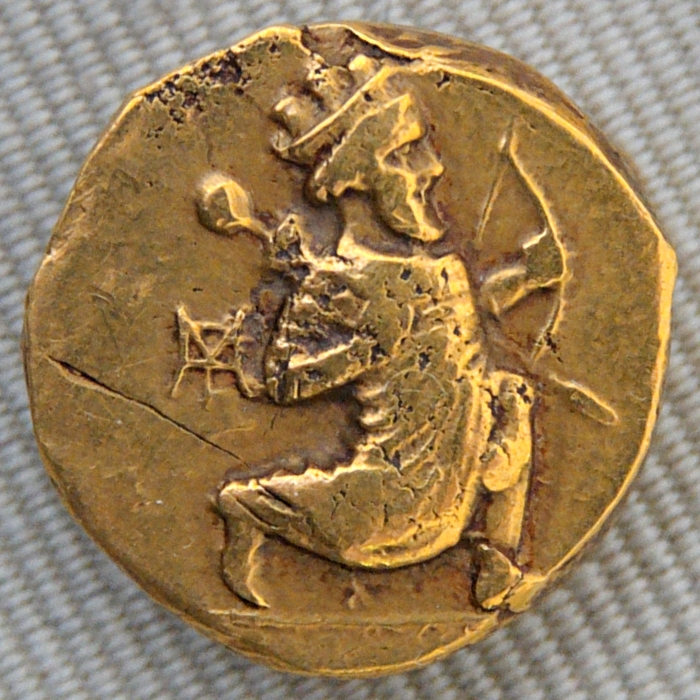
Daric of Artaxerxes II

The Persian daric was the first gold coin which, along with a similar silver coin, the siglos, introduced the bimetallic monetary standard of the Achaemenids, which has continued until today. This was accomplished by Darius I, who reinforced the empire and expanded Persepolis as a ceremonial capital; he revolutionized the economy by placing it on the silver and gold coinage.

=== Tax districts ===
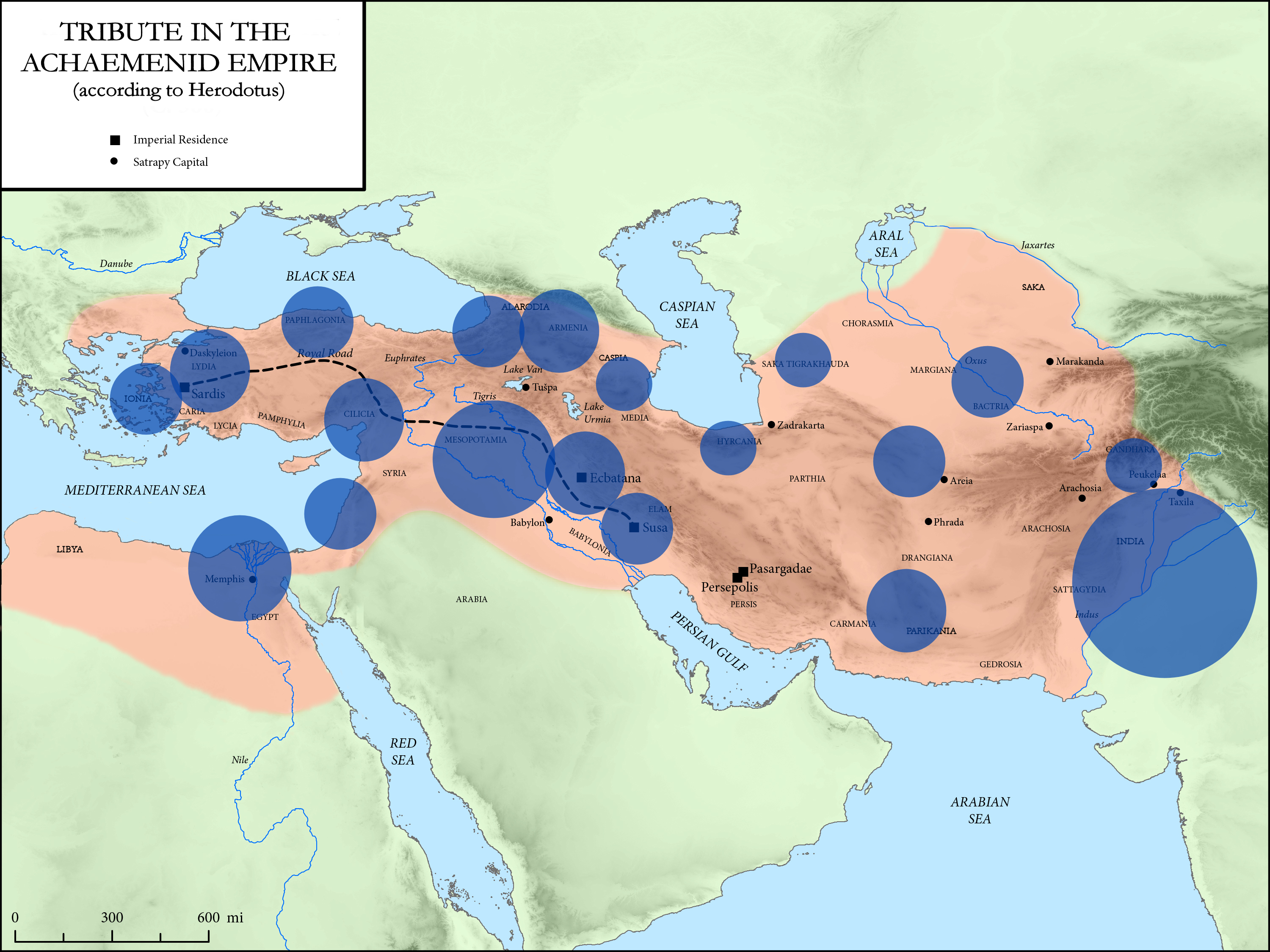
Volume of annual tribute per district, in the Achaemenid Empire, according to Herodotus.

Darius also introduced a regulated and sustainable tax system that was precisely tailored to each satrapy, based on their supposed productivity and their economic potential. For instance, Babylon was assessed for the highest amount and for a startling mixture of commodities – 1,000 silver talents, four months' supply of food for the army. India was famed for its gold, while Egypt was renowned for its agricultural wealth; destined as the Persian Empire's granary (later Rome's), Egypt had to supply 120,000 measures of grain plus 700 talents of silver. This was exclusively a tax levied on subject peoples. There is evidence that conquered and rebellious enemies could be sold into slavery. Alongside its other innovations in administration and taxation, the Achaemenids may have been the first government in the ancient Near East to register private slave sales and tax them using an early form of sales tax.

Other accomplishments of Darius' reign included the codification of the dāta (a universal legal system which would become the basis of later Iranian law), and the construction of a new capital at Persepolis.

=== Transportation and communication ===
Under the Achaemenids, trade was extensive and there was an efficient infrastructure that facilitated the exchange of commodities in the far reaches of the empire. Tariffs on trade, along with agriculture and tribute, were major sources of revenue for the empire.

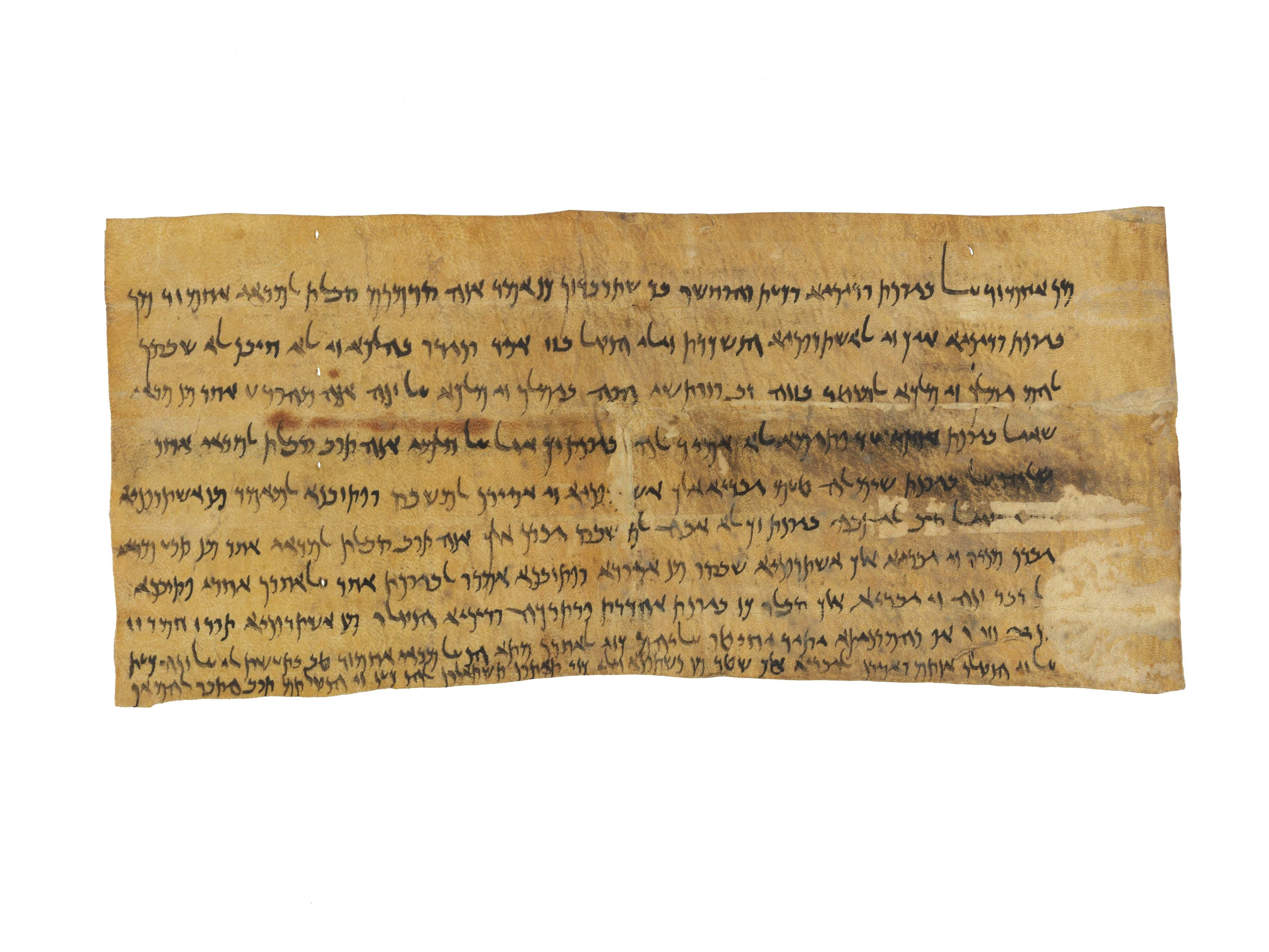
Letter from the Satrap of Bactria to the governor of Khulmi, concerning camel keepers, 353 BC

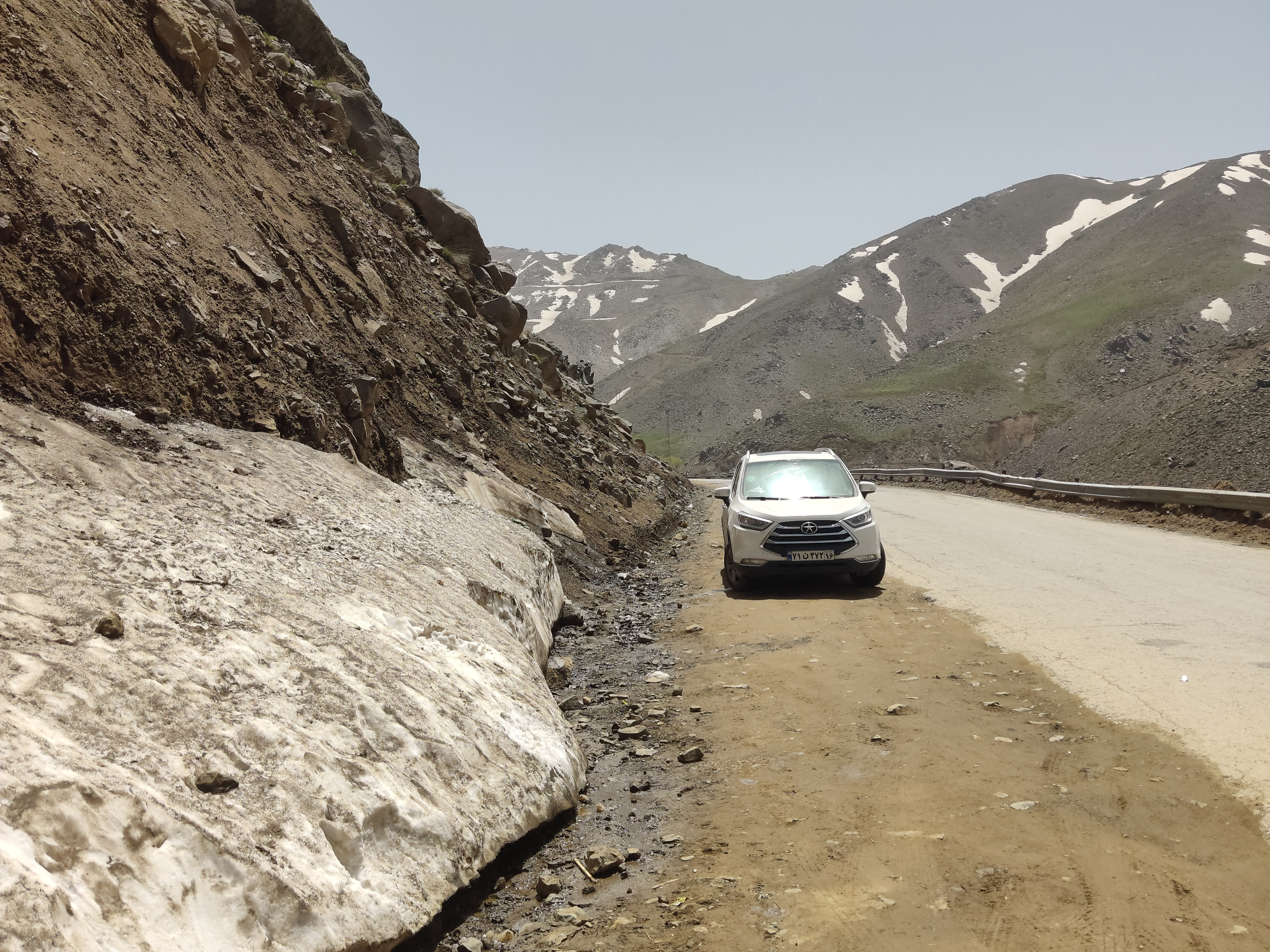
Part of the royal road that connected Ecbatana to Anatolia, this road is still in use today.

The satrapies were linked by a 2,500-kilometer highway, the most impressive stretch being the Royal Road from Susa to Sardis, built under the command of Darius I. It connected the Iranian Plateau to Central Asia and the Mediterranean. It featured stations and caravanserais at specific intervals. The relays of mounted couriers (the angarium) could reach the remotest of areas in fifteen days. Herodotus observes that "there is nothing in the world that travels faster than these Persian couriers. Neither snow, nor rain, nor heat, nor gloom of night stays these courageous couriers from the swift completion of their appointed rounds." Despite the relative local independence given by the satrapy system, royal inspectors toured the empire and reported on local conditions.

Another highway of commerce was the Great Khorasan Road, an informal mercantile route that originated in the fertile lowlands of Mesopotamia and snaked through the Zagros highlands, through the Iranian plateau and Afghanistan into the Central Asian regions of Samarkand, Merv and Ferghana, allowing for the construction of frontier cities like Cyropolis. After Alexander's conquests, the highway carried syncretic movements such as Greco-Buddhism into Central Asia and China, and allowed the Kushan, Indo-Greek and Parthian empires to profit from trade between East and West. This route was greatly rehabilitated and formalized during the Abbasid Caliphate, during which it developed into a major component of the famed Silk Road.

== Military ==
Despite its humble origins in Persis, the empire reached an enormous size under the leadership of Cyrus the Great. Cyrus created a multi-state empire where he allowed regional rulers, satraps, to rule as his proxy over a certain designated area of his empire called a satrapy. The basic rule of governance was based upon loyalty and obedience of each satrapy to the central power, or the king, and compliance with tax laws. Due to the ethno-cultural diversity of the subject nations under the rule of Persia, its enormous geographic size, and the constant struggle for power by regional competitors, the creation of a professional army was necessary for both maintenance of the peace and to enforce the authority of the king in cases of rebellion and foreign threat. Cyrus managed to create a strong land army, using it to advance in his campaigns in Babylonia, Lydia, and Asia Minor, which after his death was used by his son Cambyses II, in Egypt against Psamtik III. Cyrus would die battling a local Iranian insurgency in the empire, before he could have a chance to develop a naval force. Darius I assumed that responsibility, establishing the Persians' first royal navy to confront foes across imperial waters such as the Black Sea, Aegean Sea, Persian Gulf, Ionian Sea, and Mediterranean Sea.

=== Ethnic composition ===
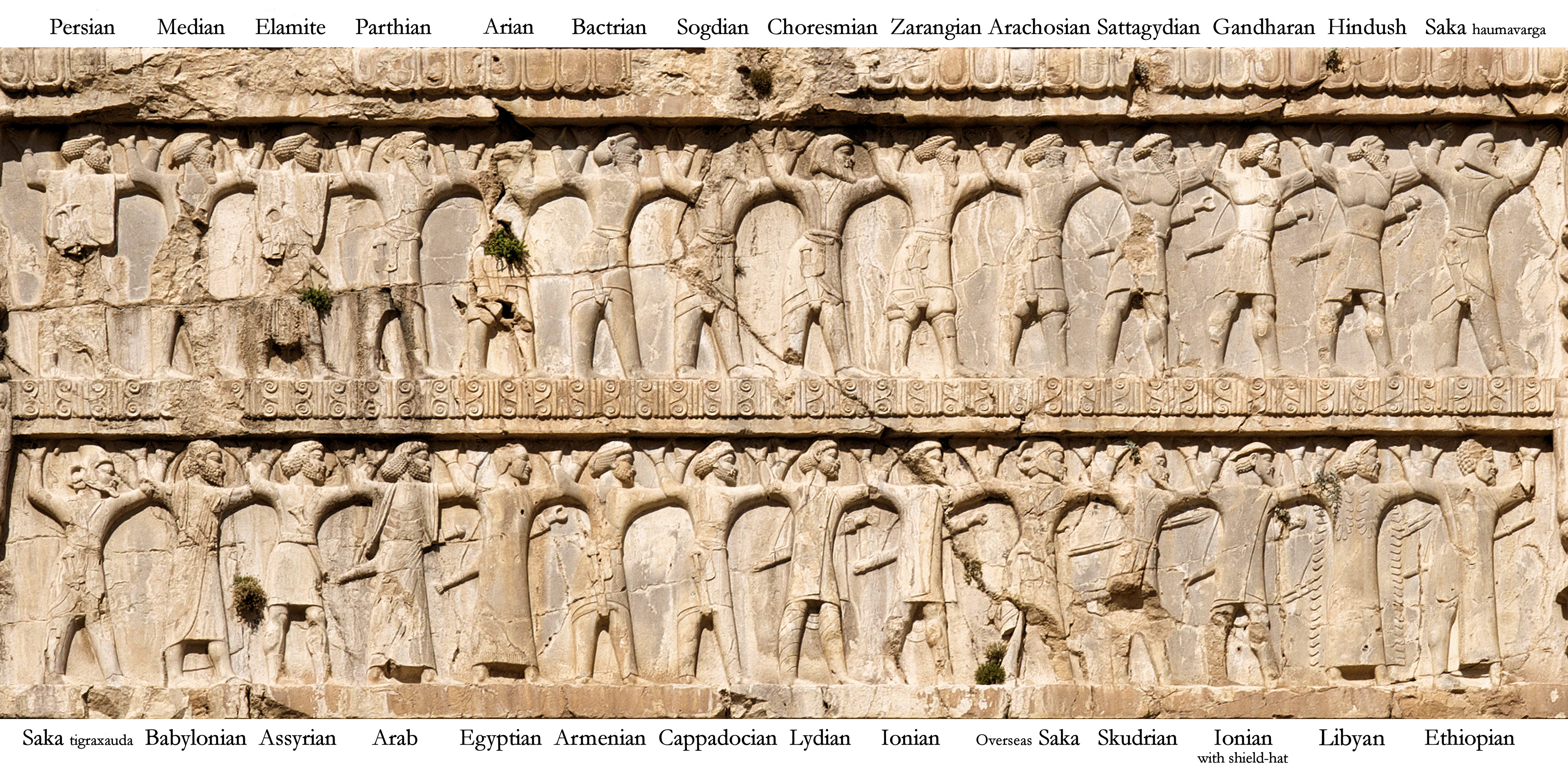
Relief of throne-bearing soldiers in their native clothing at the tomb of Xerxes I, demonstrating the satrapies under his rule.

The empire included many peoples and Herodotus mentions the following as participating in the Second Persian invasion of Greece: Persians, Macedonians, European Thracians, Paeonians, Medes, Achaean Greeks, Cissians, Hyrcanians, Assyrians, Chaldeans, Bactrians, Sacae, Arians, Parthians, Chorasmians, Sogdians, Gandarans, Dadicae, Caspians, Sarangae, Pactyes, Utians, Mycians, Phoenicians, Judeans, Egyptians, Cyprians, Cilicians, Pamphylians, Lycians, Dorians of Asia, Carians, Ionians, Aegean islanders, Aeolians, Greeks from Pontus, Paricanians, Arabians, Ethiopians of Africa, Ethiopians of Baluchistan, Libyans, Paphlagonians, Ligyes, Matieni, Mariandyni, Cappadocians, Phrygians, Armenians, Lydians, Mysians, Asian Thracians, Lasonii, Milyae, Moschi, Tibareni, Macrones, Mossynoeci, Mares, Colchians, Alarodians, Saspirians, Red Sea islanders, Sagartians, Hindush, Eordi, Bottiaei, Chalcidians, Brygians, Pierians, Perrhaebi, Enienes, Dolopes, and Magnesians.

=== Infantry ===
The Achaemenid infantry consisted of three groups: the Immortals, the Sparabara, and the Takabara, though in the later years of the Achaemenid Empire, a fourth group, the Cardaces, were introduced.

The Immortals were described by Herodotus as being heavy infantry, led by Hydarnes II, that were kept constantly at a strength of exactly 10,000 men. He claimed that the unit's name stemmed from the custom that every killed, seriously wounded, or sick member was immediately replaced with a new one, maintaining the numbers and cohesion of the unit. They had wicker shields, short spears, swords or large daggers, and bow and arrows. Underneath their robes they wore scale armour coats. The spear counterbalances of the common soldiery were of silver; to differentiate commanding ranks, the officers' spear butt-spikes were golden. Surviving Achaemenid colored glazed bricks and carved reliefs represent the Immortals as wearing elaborate robes, hoop earrings and gold jewellery, though these garments and accessories were most likely worn only for ceremonial occasions.

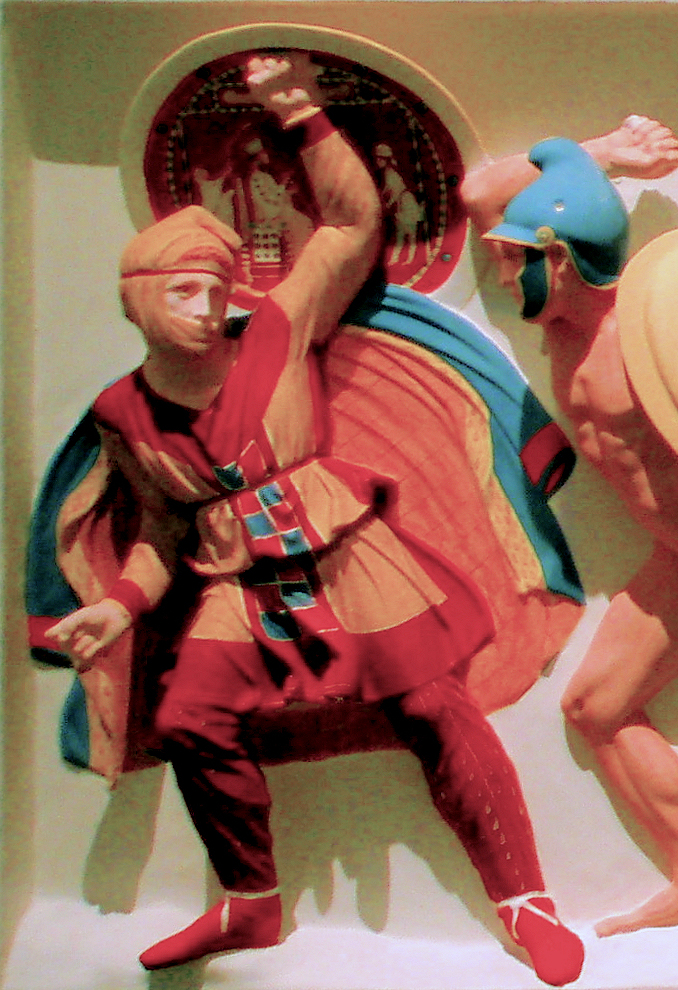
Color reconstruction of Achaemenid infantry on the Alexander Sarcophagus (end of 4th century BC).

The Sparabara were usually the first to engage in hand-to-hand combat with the enemy. Though little survives about them, they are thought to have formed the Persian army's core, creating a shield wall and wielding two-metre spears to shield vulnerable units such as archers. The Sparabara were taken from the full members of Persian society, were trained from childhood to be soldiers and when not called out to fight on campaigns in distant lands they practised hunting on the vast plains of Persia. However, when all was quiet and the Pax Persica held true, the Sparabara returned to normal life farming the land and grazing their herds. Because of this, they lacked true professional quality on the battlefield, yet they were well trained and courageous to the point of holding the line in most situations long enough for a counter-attack. They were armoured with quilted linen and carried large rectangular wicker shields as a form of light maneuverable defence. This, however, left them at a severe disadvantage against heavily armoured opponents such as the hoplite, and their two-metre-long spear was not able to give the Sparabara ample range to plausibly engage a trained phalanx. The wicker shields were able to effectively stop arrows but not strong enough to protect the soldier from spears. However, the Sparabara could deal with most other infantry, including trained units from the East.

The Achaemenids relied heavily on archery. Major contributing nations were the Scythians, Medes, Persians, and the Elamites. The composite bow was used by the Persians and Medes, who adopted it from the Scythians and transmitted it to other nations, including the Greeks. Achaemenid armies typically used socketed, three-bladed (also known as trilobate or Scythian) arrowheads. These arrowheads were cast from leaded tin-bronze, which made them amenable to mass-production unlike the wrought iron arrowheads of the period that had to be individually forged.

The Takabara were a rare unit who were a tough type of peltasts. They tended to fight with their own native weapons which would have included a crescent-shaped light wickerwork shield and axes as well as light linen cloth and leather. The Takabara were recruited from territories that incorporated modern Iran.

=== Cavalry ===
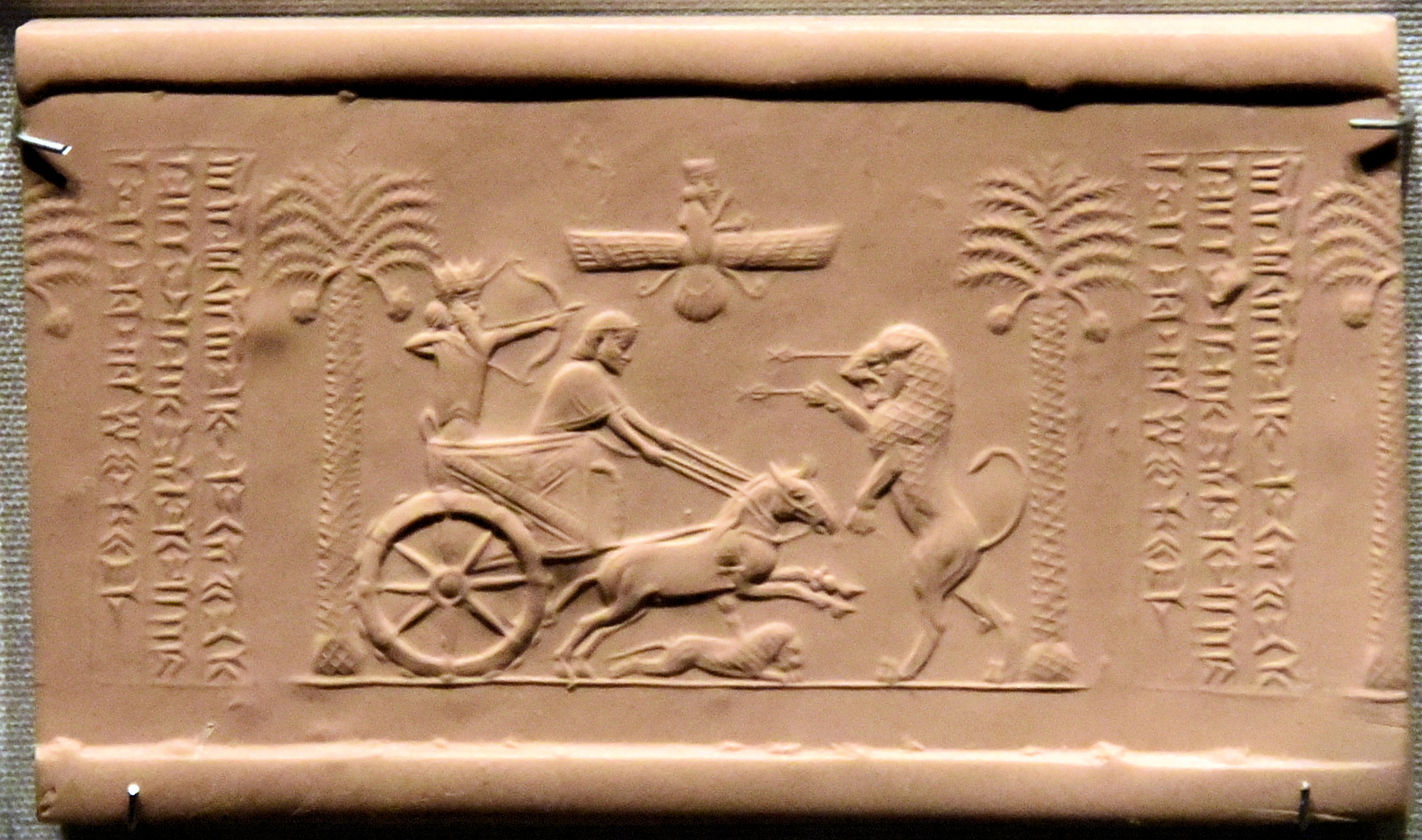
Seal of Darius the Great hunting in a chariot

The Persian cavalry was crucial for conquering nations and maintained its importance in the Achaemenid army to the last days of the Achaemenid Empire. The cavalry was separated into four groups. The Persian mounted forces comprised horse cavalry, chariotry (including scythed chariots), and units of camel-borne troops, though the chariots and camels were rarely effective against massed infantry.

In the later years of the Achaemenid Empire, the chariot archer had become merely a ceremonial part of the Persian army, yet in the early years of the Empire, their use was widespread. The chariot archers were armed with lances, bows, arrows, swords, and scale armour. The horses were also suited with scale armour similar to scale armour of the Sassanian cataphracts. The chariots would contain imperial symbols and decorations.

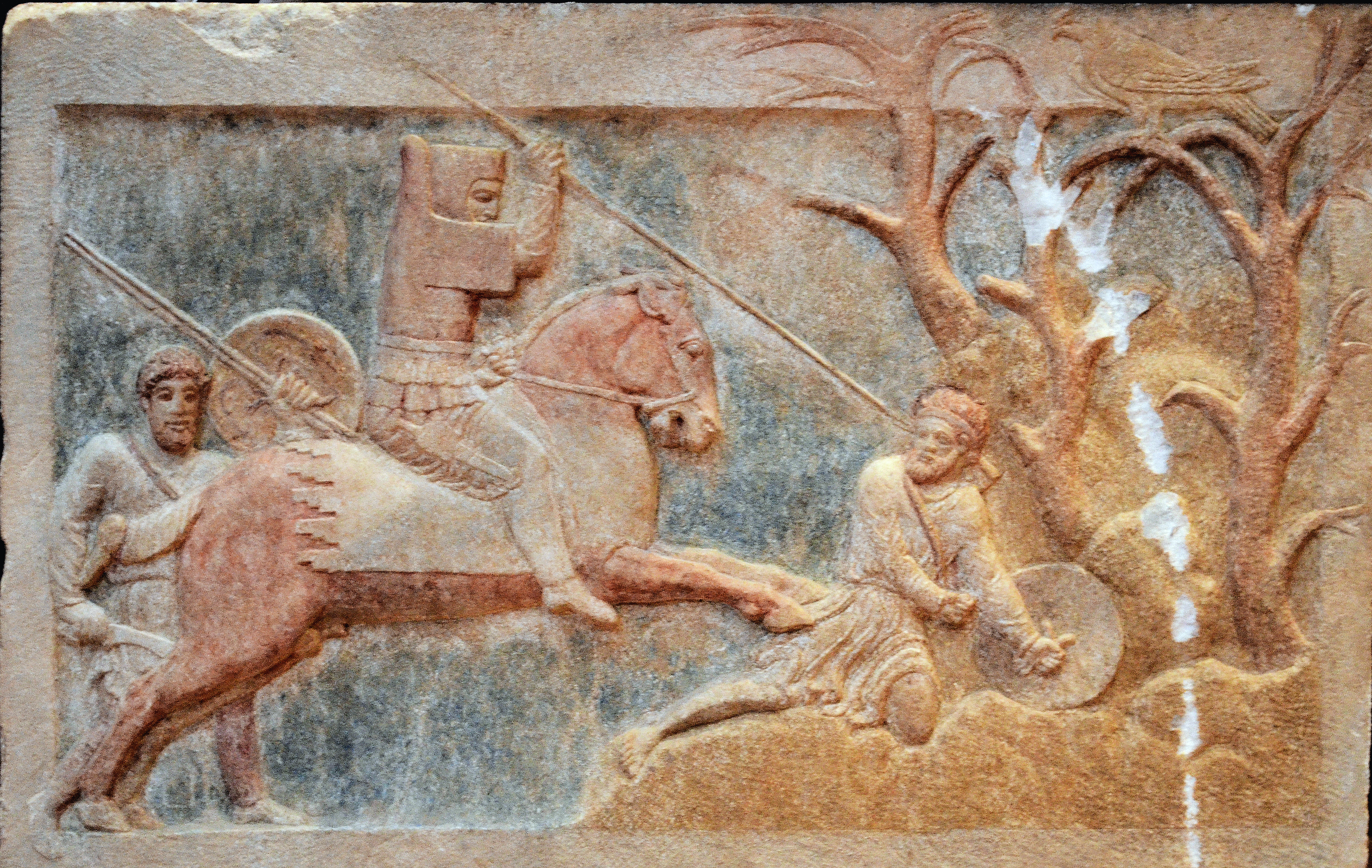
Armoured cavalry: Achaemenid Dynast of Hellespontine Phrygia attacking a Greek psiloi, Altıkulaç Sarcophagus, early 4th century BC.

The horses used by the Achaemenids for cavalry were often suited with scale armour, like most cavalry units. The riders often had the same armour as Infantry units, wicker shields, short spears, swords or large daggers, bow and arrow, and scale armour coats. The camel cavalry was different, because the camels and sometimes the riders, were provided little protection against enemies, yet when they were offered protection, they would have lances, swords, bow, arrow, and scale armour. The camel cavalry was first introduced into the Persian army by Cyrus the Great, at the Battle of Thymbra. The elephant was most likely introduced into the Persian army by Darius I after his conquest of the Indus Valley. Elephants may have been used in Greek campaigns by Darius and Xerxes I, but Greek accounts only mention 15 of them being used at the Battle of Gaugamela.

=== Navy ===
Darius I was the first Achaemenid king to invest in a Persian fleet, after the empire came into contact with Greeks and Egyptians with their own maritime traditions and capabilities. The personnel for the imperial navy were often Phoenicians (mostly from Sidon), Egyptians and Greeks rather than Iranians.

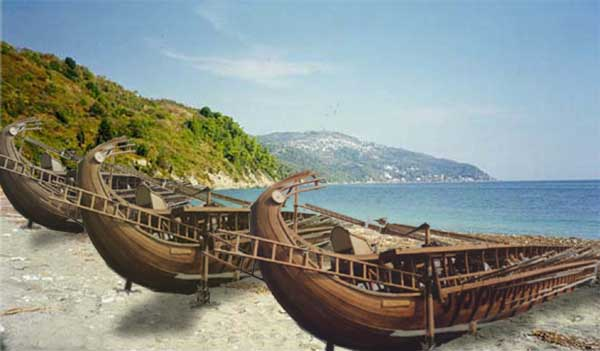
Reconstitution of Persian landing ships at the Battle of Marathon.

At first the ships were built in Sidon by the Phoenicians; the first Achaemenid ships measured about 40 meters in length and 6 meters in width, able to transport up to 300 Persian troops at any one trip. Soon, other states of the empire were constructing their own ships, each incorporating slight local preferences. A maritime presence was established in the Persian Gulf and ships that could carry 100 to 200 troops patrolled rivers including the Karun, Tigris and Nile in the west, as well as the Indus.

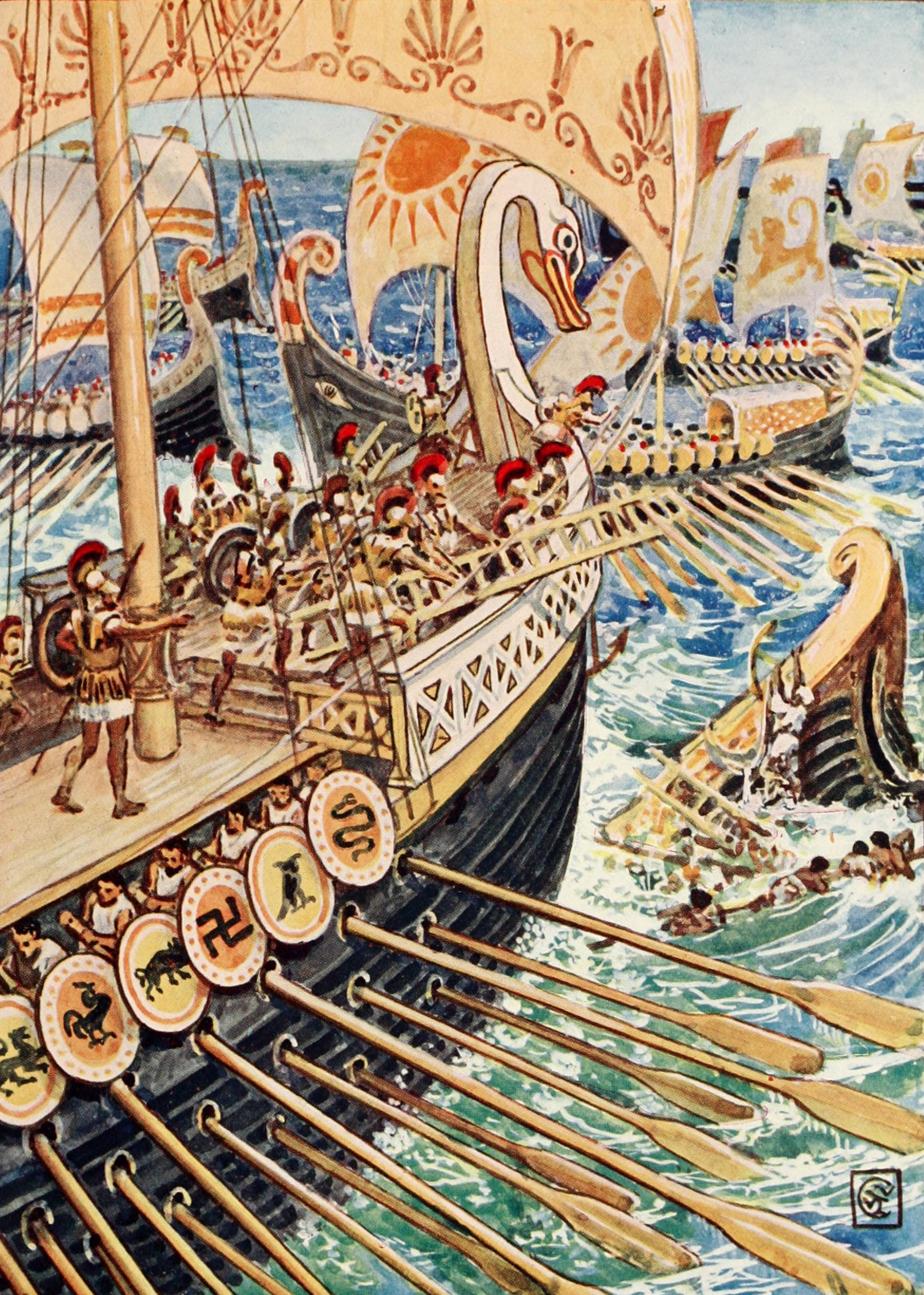
Greek ships against Achaemenid ships at the Battle of Salamis.

The navy established bases on the Karun, and in Bahrain, Oman, and Yemen, and opened the door to trade with India via the Persian Gulf. Artaxerxes II constructed a Mediterranean fleet in the summer 397 BC as part of a rearmament that culminated in his decisive victory at Knidos in 394 BC, restoring Achaemenid control over Ionia, and also used his navy to quell a rebellion in Egypt.

The ships were made of wood, but some had metallic blades on the front to slice enemy ships using the ship's momentum, some had hooks on the side to grab enemy ships, and some were equipped with two mangonels to launch stones or flammable substances. The ships were propelled by sails or oars.

Darius I, in an attempt to subdue the Scythian horsemen north of the Black Sea, crossed the Bosphorus on a pontoon bridge joining the closest points of Asia and Europe across at least 1,000 meters of open water, then marched up to the Danube, crossing it by means of a second one. Xerxes I built two pontoon bridges across the Hellespont in his unsuccessful invasion of Greece; Herodotus describes those and examples of Persians using pontoon bridges. Xenophon gives an eyewitness account of a military pontoon bridge across the Tigris built using thirty-seven ships.

== Culture ==
=== Languages ===
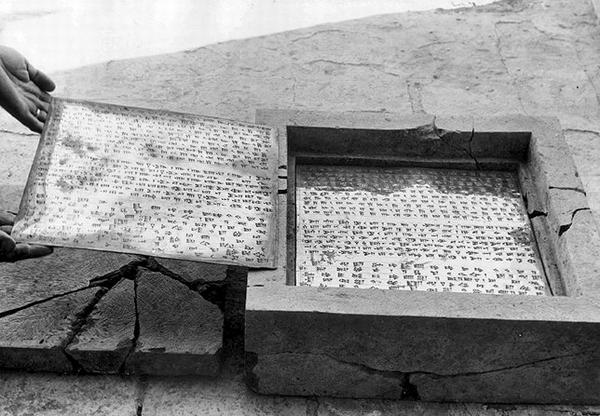
Gold foundation tablets of Darius I for the Apadana Palace, in their original stone box. The Apadana coin hoard had been deposited underneath c. 510 BC.

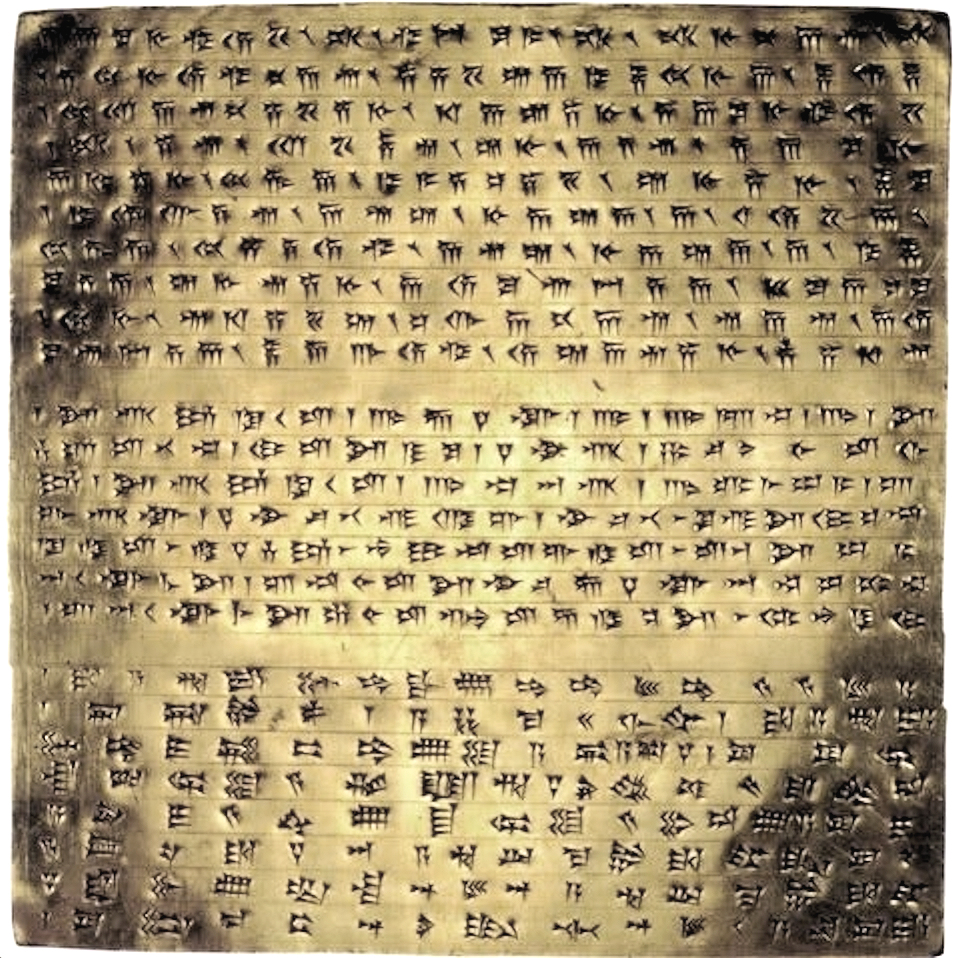
One of the two gold deposition plates. Two more were in silver. They all had the same trilingual inscription (DPh inscription).

During the reign of Cyrus II and Darius I, and as long as the seat of government was still at Susa in Elam, the language of the chancellery was Elamite. This is primarily attested in the Persepolis fortification and treasury tablets that reveal details of the day-to-day functioning of the empire. The Elamite texts in the kings' large rock-face inscriptions are invariably accompanied by Akkadian (Babylonian dialect) and Old Persian versions, and appear to be translations of the Old Persian originals. It is then likely that although Elamite was used by the capital government in Susa, it was not a standardized language.

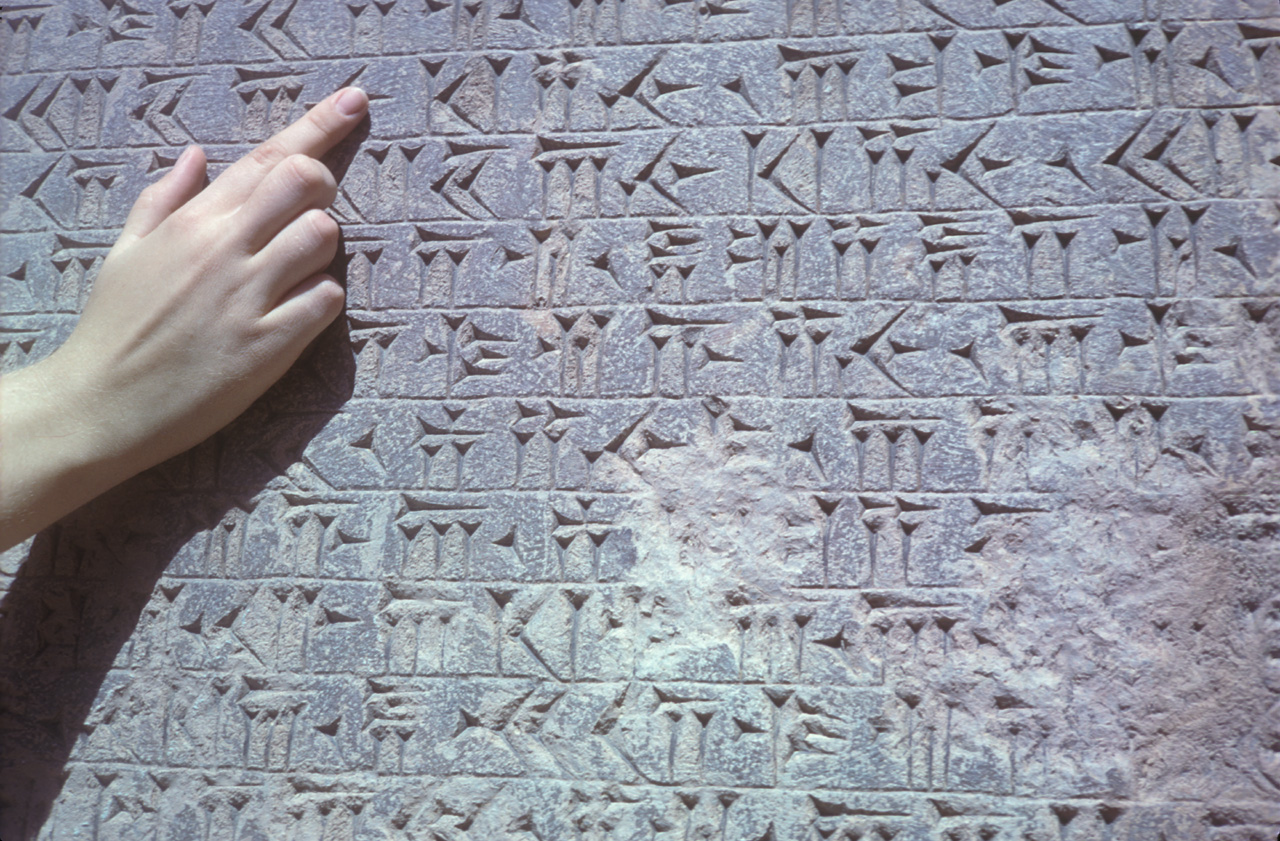
A section of the Old Persian part of the trilingual Behistun inscription. Other versions are in Babylonian and Elamite.

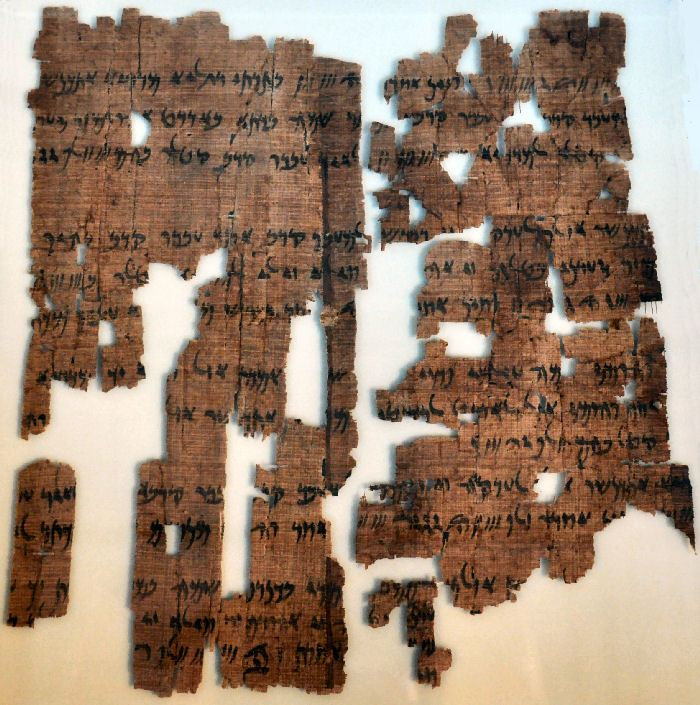
The Behistun papyrus, a copy of the Behistun inscription in Aramaic on a papyrus. Aramaic was the lingua franca of the empire.

Following the conquest of Mesopotamia, the Aramaic language (as used in that territory) was adopted as a "vehicle for written communication between the different regions of the vast empire with its different peoples and languages. The use of a single official language, which modern scholarship has dubbed "Official Aramaic" or "Imperial Aramaic", can be assumed to have greatly contributed to the astonishing success of the Achaemenids in holding their far-flung empire together for as long as they did."

In 1955, Richard Frye questioned the classification of Imperial Aramaic as an official language, noting that no surviving edict expressly and unambiguously accorded that status to any particular language. Frye reclassifies Imperial Aramaic as the lingua franca of the Achaemenid empire, suggesting that the use of Aramaic language in Achaemenid empire was more widespread than generally thought. Many centuries after the fall of the empire, Aramaic script and—as ideograms—Aramaic vocabulary would survive as the essential characteristics of the Pahlavi writing system.

Although Old Persian also appears on some seals and art objects, that language is attested primarily in the Achaemenid inscriptions of Western Iran, suggesting then that Old Persian was the common language of that region. However, by the reign of Artaxerxes II, the grammar and orthography of the inscriptions was so "far from perfect" that it has been suggested that the scribes who composed those texts had already largely forgotten the language, and had to rely on older inscriptions, which they to a great extent reproduced verbatim.

When the occasion demanded, Achaemenid administrative correspondence was conducted in Greek, making it a widely used bureaucratic language. Native Old Iranian sources show no Greek linguistic influence, despite extensive Achaemenid-Greek contact and the Achaemenid conquest of many Greek-speaking areas in Europe and Asia Minor at various times. Besides Herodotus' accounts, evidence shows Greeks were deployed and employed in the empire's core regions and also lived and worked in its heartland, Iran. For example, Greeks were part of the various ethnicities that constructed Darius' palace in Susa, apart from the Greek inscriptions found nearby there, and one short Persepolis tablet written in Greek.

=== Customs ===
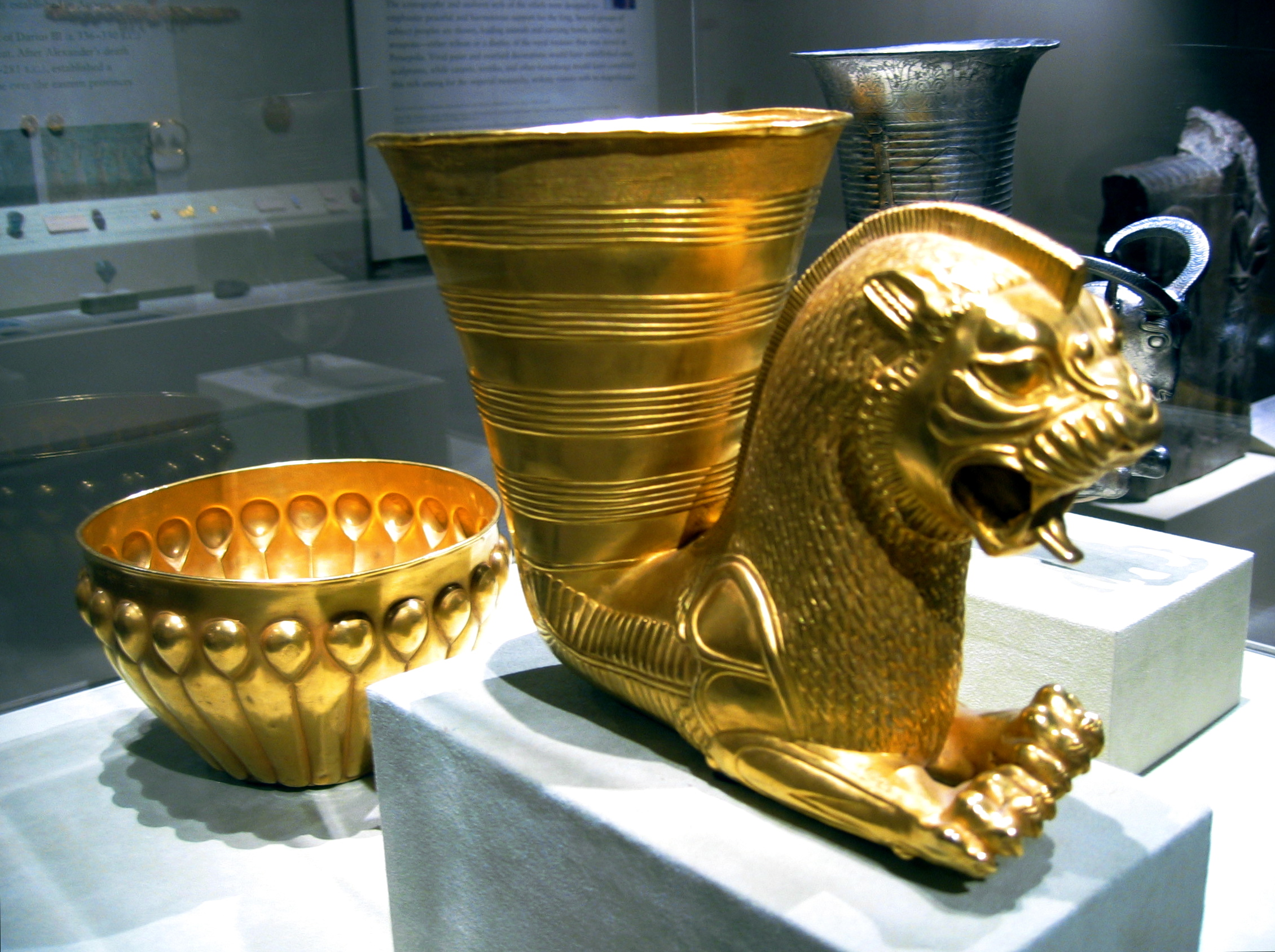
An Achaemenid rhyton, or drinking vessel

Herodotus mentions that the Persians were invited to great birthday feasts (Herodotus, Histories 8), which would be followed by many desserts, a treat which they reproached the Greeks for omitting from their meals. He also observed that the Persians drank wine in large quantities and used it even for counsel, deliberating on important affairs when drunk, and deciding the next day, when sober, whether to act on the decision or set it aside.

=== Religion ===
Religious toleration has been described as a "remarkable feature" of the Achaemenid Empire. The Hebrew Bible reports that Persian king Cyrus the Great released the Jewish people from the Babylonian captivity in 539–530 BC and permitted them to return to their homeland. Cyrus the Great assisted in the restoration of the sacred places of various cities, including to rebuild the Israelites' Temple in Jerusalem.

It was during the Achaemenid period that Zoroastrianism reached southwestern Iran, where it came to be accepted by the rulers and through them became a defining element of Persian culture. The religion was not only accompanied by a formalization of the concepts and divinities of the traditional Iranian pantheon but also introduced several novel ideas, including that of free will.

Mithra was worshipped in the Empire; his temples and symbols were the most widespread, most people bore names related to him and most festivals were dedicated to him.

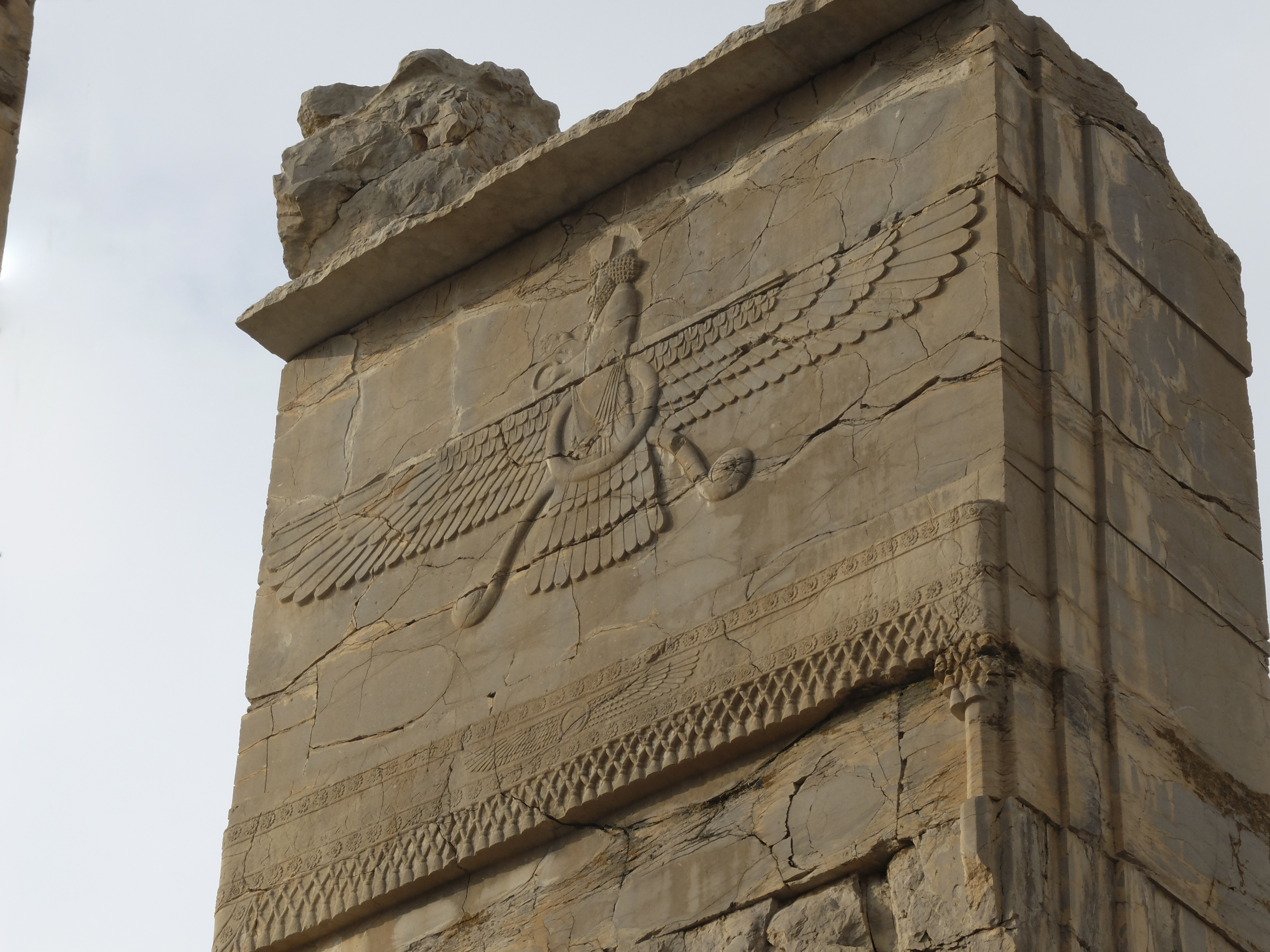
A bas-relief of Farvahar at Persepolis

During the reign of Artaxerxes I and Darius II, the Greek historian Herodotus wrote: "[the Persians] have no images of the gods, no temples nor altars, and consider the use of them a sign of folly. This comes, I think, from their not believing the gods to have the same nature with men, as the Greeks imagine." He claims the Persians offer sacrifice to: "the sun and moon, to the earth, to fire, to water, and to the winds. These are the only gods whose worship has come down to them from ancient times. At a later period, they began the worship of Urania, which they borrowed from the Arabians and Assyrians. Mylitta is the name by which the Assyrians know this goddess, to whom the Persians referred as Anahita."

The Babylonian scholar and priest Berosus records—although writing over seventy years after the reign of Artaxerxes II—that the emperor had been the first to make cult statues of divinities and have them placed in temples in many of the major cities of the empire. Berosus also substantiates Herodotus when he says the Persians knew of no images of gods until Artaxerxes II erected those images. On the means of sacrifice, Herodotus adds "they raise no altar, light no fire, pour no libations." Herodotus also observed that "no prayer or offering can be made without a magus present".

=== Women ===
The position of women in the Achaemenid Empire varied depending on the culture to which they belonged and therefore differed by region. The position of Persian women in Persia proper has traditionally been reconstructed from mythological Biblical references and the sometimes biased Ancient Greek sources, neither fully reliable, while the most reliable evidence is the archeological Persepolis Fortification Tablets (PFT), which describe women connected to the royal court at Persepolis, from royal women to female laborers who received food rations there.

The hierarchy of royal women at the Persian court was ranked as follows: the king's mother, then the queen, the king's daughters, the king's concubines, and the other women of the royal palace. The king normally married a female member of the royal family or a Persian noblewoman related to a satrap or another important Persian man; it was permitted for members of the royal family to marry relatives, but there is no evidence for marriage between closer family members than half-siblings. The king's concubines were often either slaves, sometimes prisoners of war, or foreign princesses, whom the king did not marry because they were foreigners, and whose children did not have the right to inherit the throne.

Greek sources accuse the king of having hundreds of concubines secluded in a harem. There is no archeological evidence supporting the existence of a harem, or the seclusion of women from contact with men, at the Persian court. The royal women joined the king at breakfast and dinner and accompanied him on his journeys. They may have participated in the royal hunt, as well as during the royal banquets. Herodotus relates how the Persian envoys at the Macedonian court demanded the presence of women during a banquet because it was the custom for women to participate in the banquets in their own country.

The queen may have attended the king's audience, and archeological evidence shows that she gave her own audiences, at least for female supplicants. Royal women and noblewomen at court could travel on their own, accompanied by both male and female staff, own and manage their own fortune, land, and business. Depictions of Persian women show them with long dresses and veils which did not cover their faces or their hair, only flowing down over their neck at the back of the head as an ornament.

Royal and aristocratic Achaemenid women were given an education in subjects that did not appear compatible with seclusions, such as horsemanship and archery. Royal and aristocratic women held and managed vast estates and workshops and employed large numbers of servants and professional laborers. Royal and aristocratic women do not seem to have lived in seclusion from men, since it is known that they appeared in public and traveled with their husbands, participated in hunting and in feasts. The chief wife of a royal or aristocratic man did not live in seclusion, as it is stated that wives customarily accompanied their husbands at dinner banquets. They left the banquet when the "women entertainers" came in and the men began "merrymaking".

No woman ever ruled the Achaemenid Empire, as monarch or as regent, but some queen's consorts are known to have had influence over the affairs of state, notably Atossa and Parysatis.

There is not evidence of any women being employed as an official in the administration or within religious service; however, there are plenty of archeological evidence of women being employed as free labourers in Persepolis, where they worked alongside men. Women could be employed as the leaders of their workforce, known by the title arraššara pašabena, which were then given a higher salary than the male workers of their workforce. Female laborers were given less than men. Qualified workers within the crafts were given equal pay regardless of their sex. Women are abundant in religious context in the cuneiform sources from late Achaemenid and Hellenistic Babylon.

=== Architecture and art ===
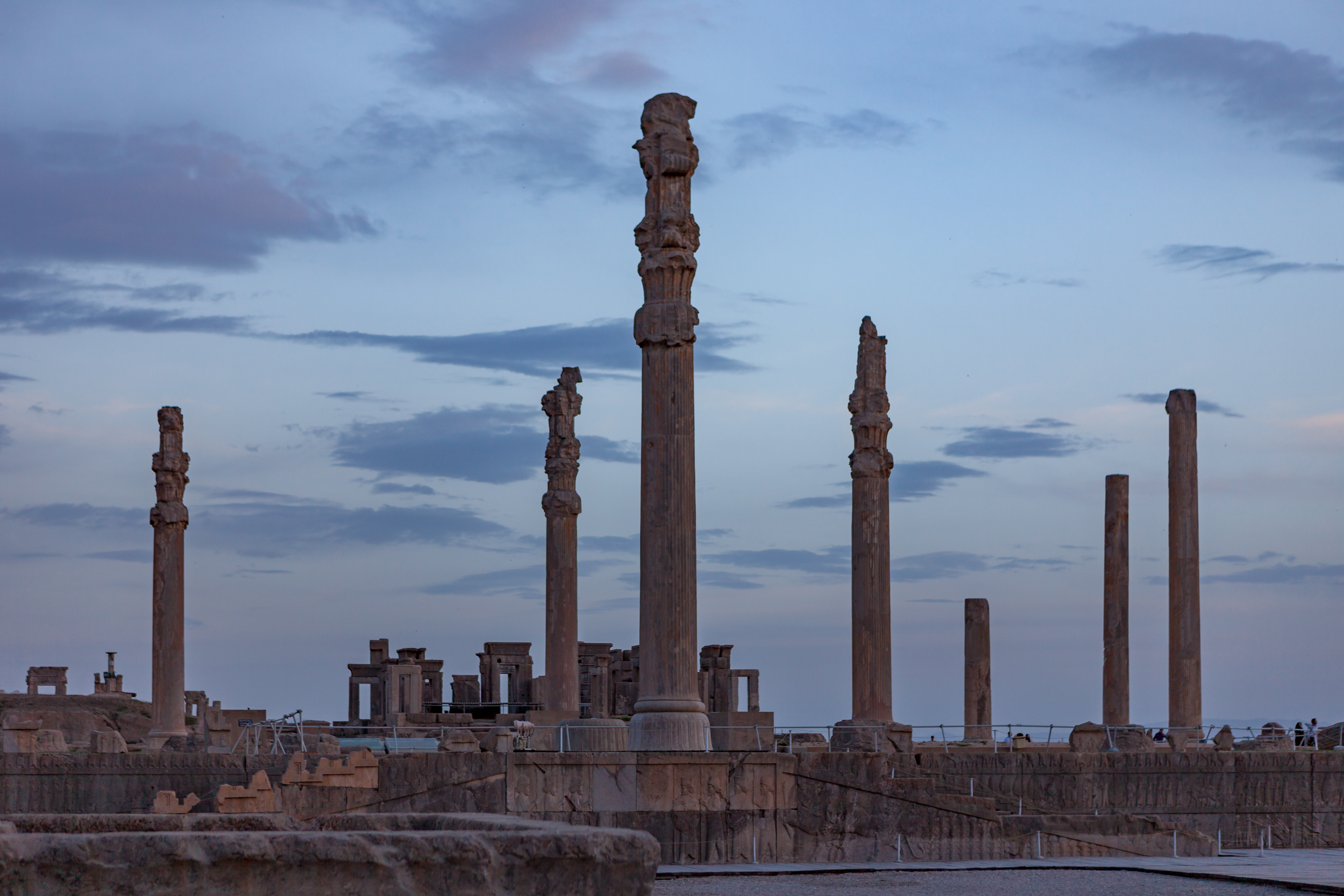
The ruins of Persepolis

Achaemenid architecture included large cities, temples, palaces, and mausolea such as the Tomb of Cyrus the Great. The quintessential feature of its architecture was its eclectic nature, with elements of Median, Assyrian, and Asiatic Greek all incorporated, yet maintaining a unique Persian identity seen in the finished products. Its influence pervades the regions ruled by the Achaemenids, from the Mediterranean shores to India, especially with its emphasis on monumental stone-cut design and gardens subdivided by water-courses.

Achaemenid art includes frieze reliefs, metalwork such as the Oxus Treasure, decoration of palaces, glazed brick masonry, fine craftsmanship (masonry, carpentry, etc.), and gardening. Although the Persians drew artists from all corners of their empire, incorporating their styles and techniques, they did not merely produce a combination of styles, but a synthesis of a new, unique Persian style.

One of the most remarkable examples of both Achaemenid architecture and art is the grand palace of Persepolis, and its detailed workmanship, coupled with its grand scale. In describing the construction of the Palace of Darius in Susa, Darius the Great records:

Yaka timber was brought from Gandara and from Carmania. The gold was brought from Sardis and from Bactria ... the precious stone lapis-lazuli and carnelian ... was brought from Sogdiana. The turquoise from Chorasmia, the silver and ebony from Egypt, the ornamentation from Ionia, the ivory from Ethiopia and from Sindh and from Arachosia. The stone-cutters who wrought the stone were Ionians and Sardians. The goldsmiths were Medes and Egyptians. The men who wrought the wood were Sardinians and Egyptians. The men who wrought the baked brick were Babylonians. The men who adorned the wall, those were Medes and Egyptians.

— Darius the Great, DSf inscription

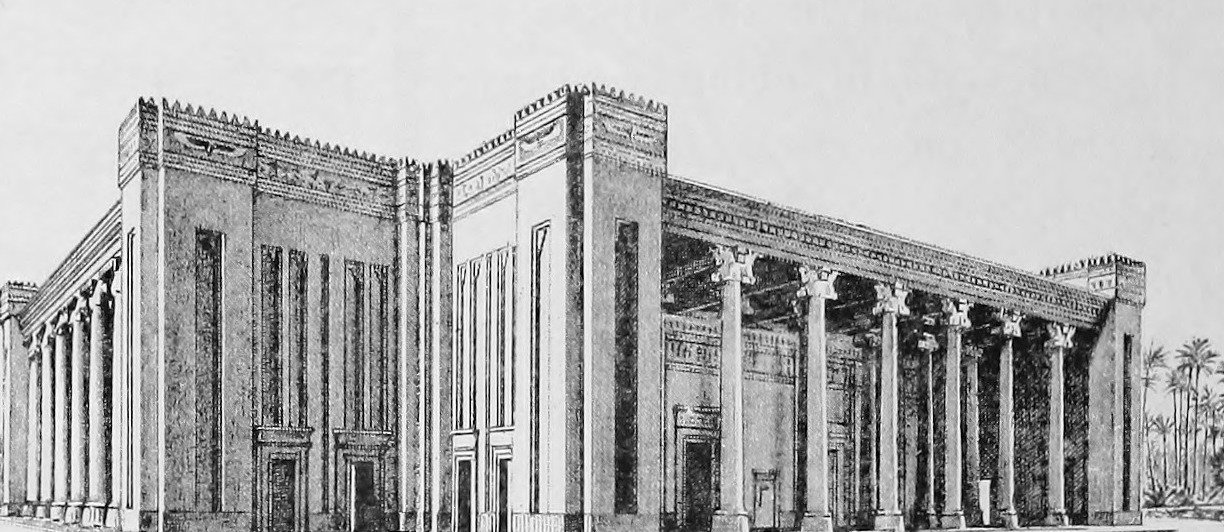
A reconstruction of the Palace of Darius in Susa. The palace served as a model for Persepolis.

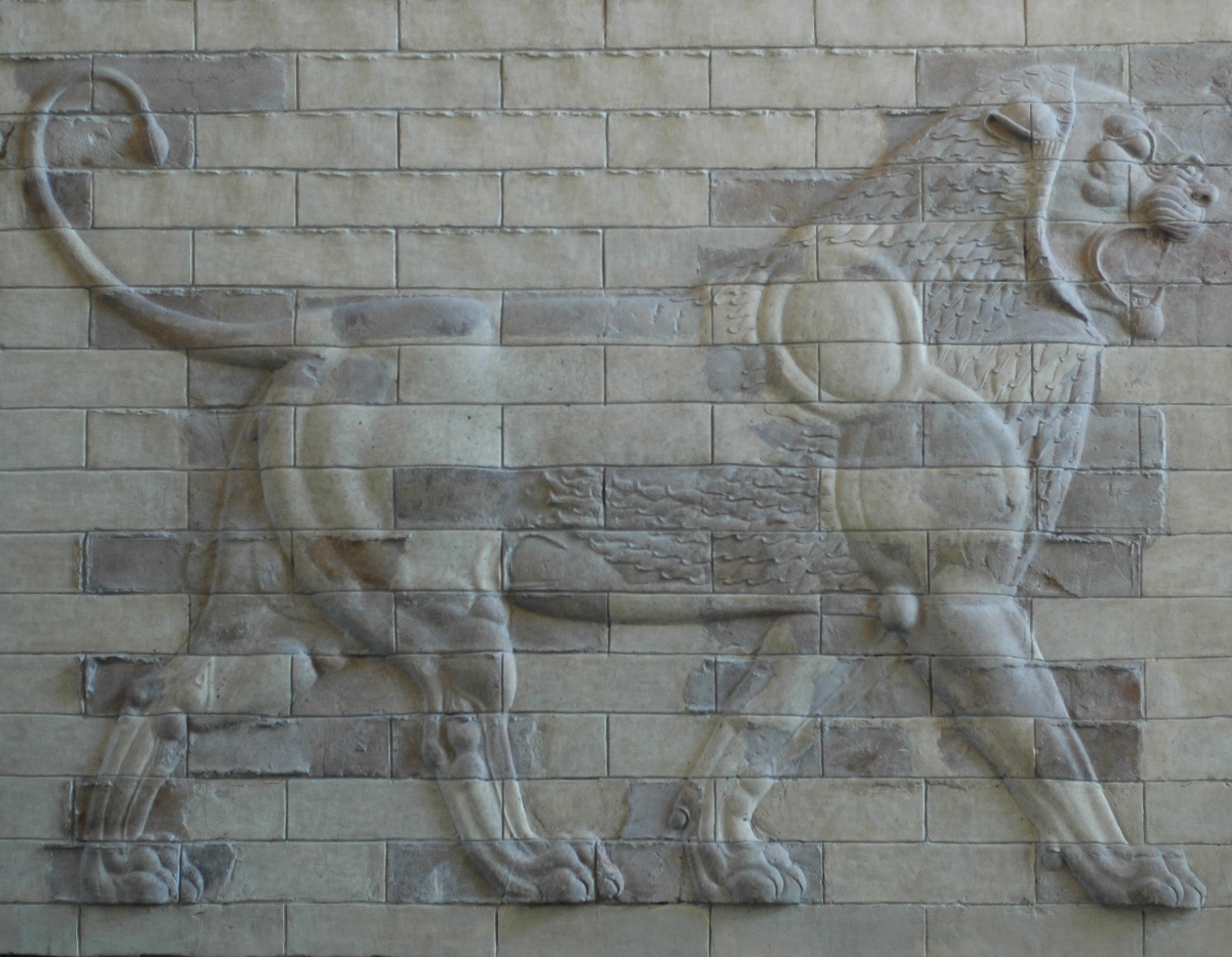
A lion on a decorative panel from Darius the Great's palace, Louvre

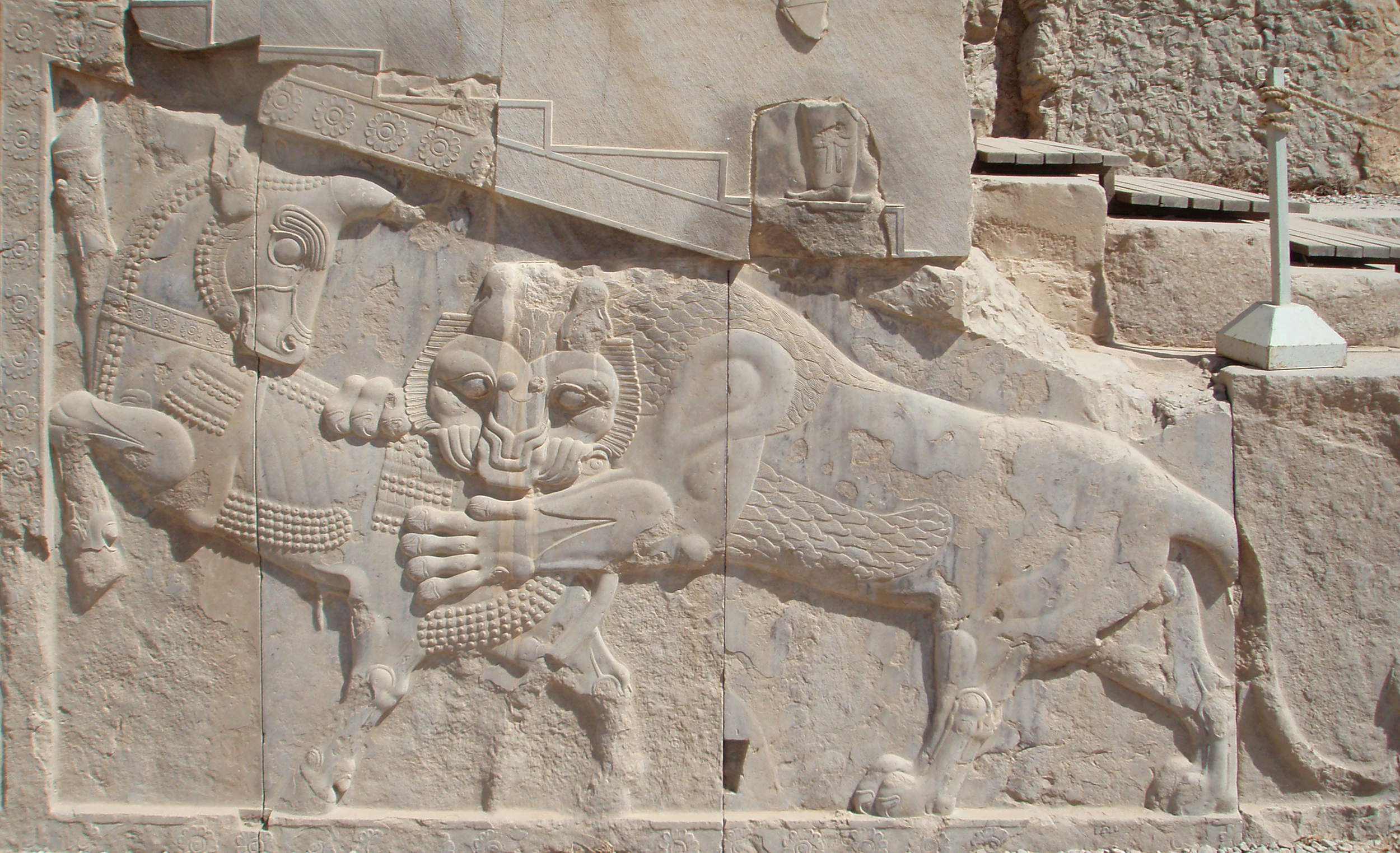
An iconic relief of lion and bull fighting, Apadana of Persepolis

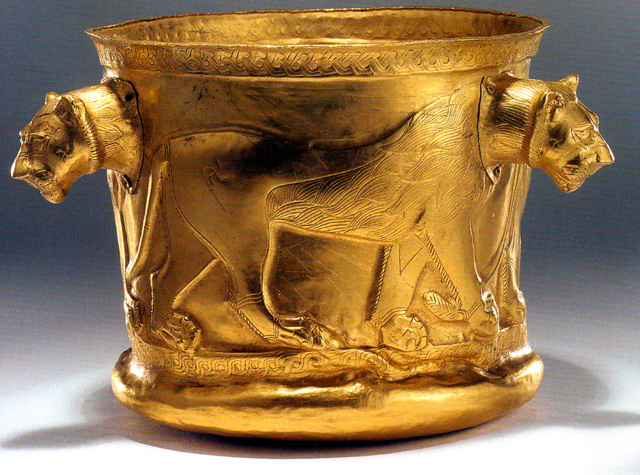
An Achaemenid golden bowl with lioness imagery, Mazandaran, National Museum of Iran

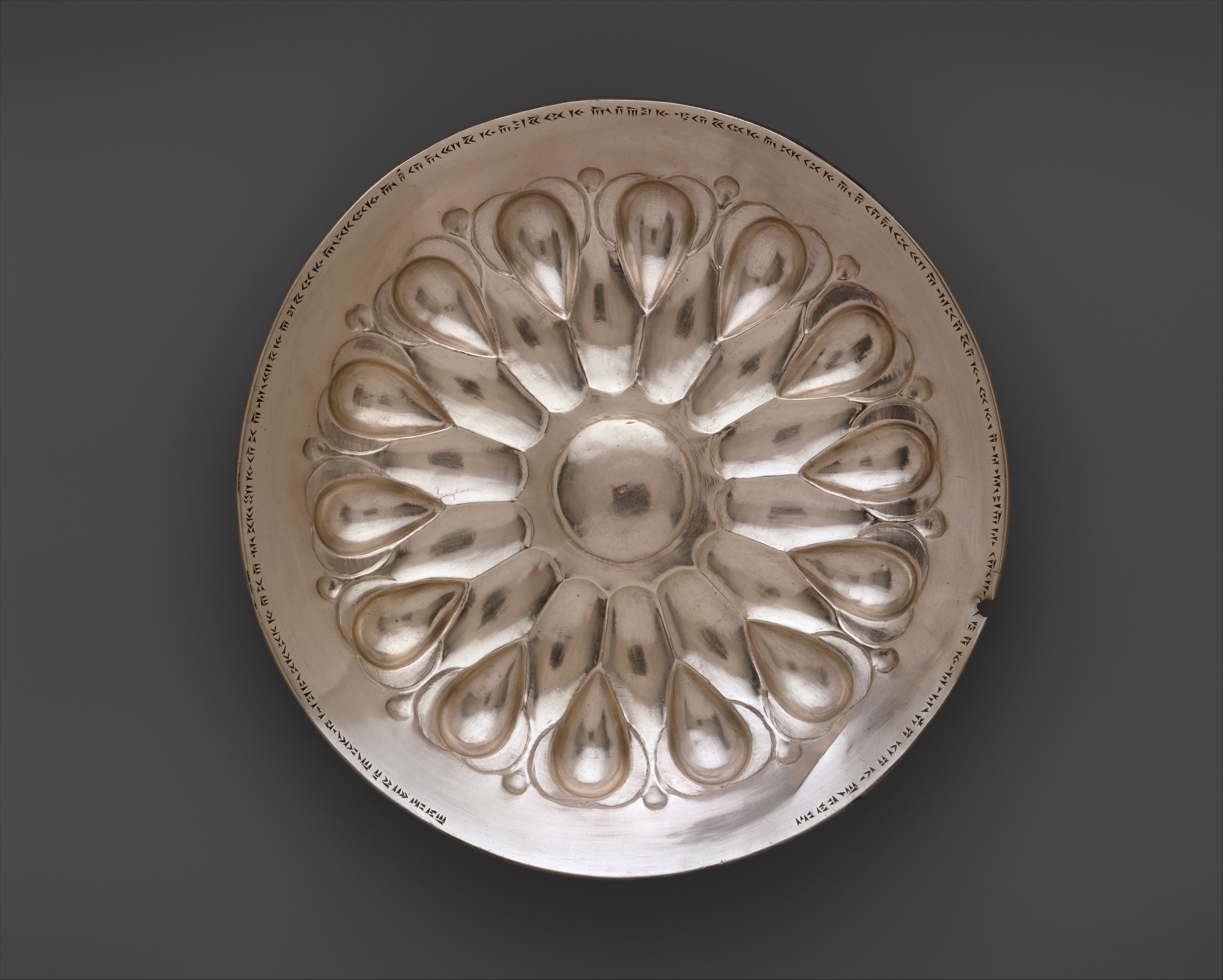
A silver phiale with a royal inscription, reading "Artaxerxes, the great king, king of kings, king of lands, son of Xerxes the king, Xerxes son of Darius the king, the Achaemenid: in his house this silver bowl was made."

=== Tombs ===
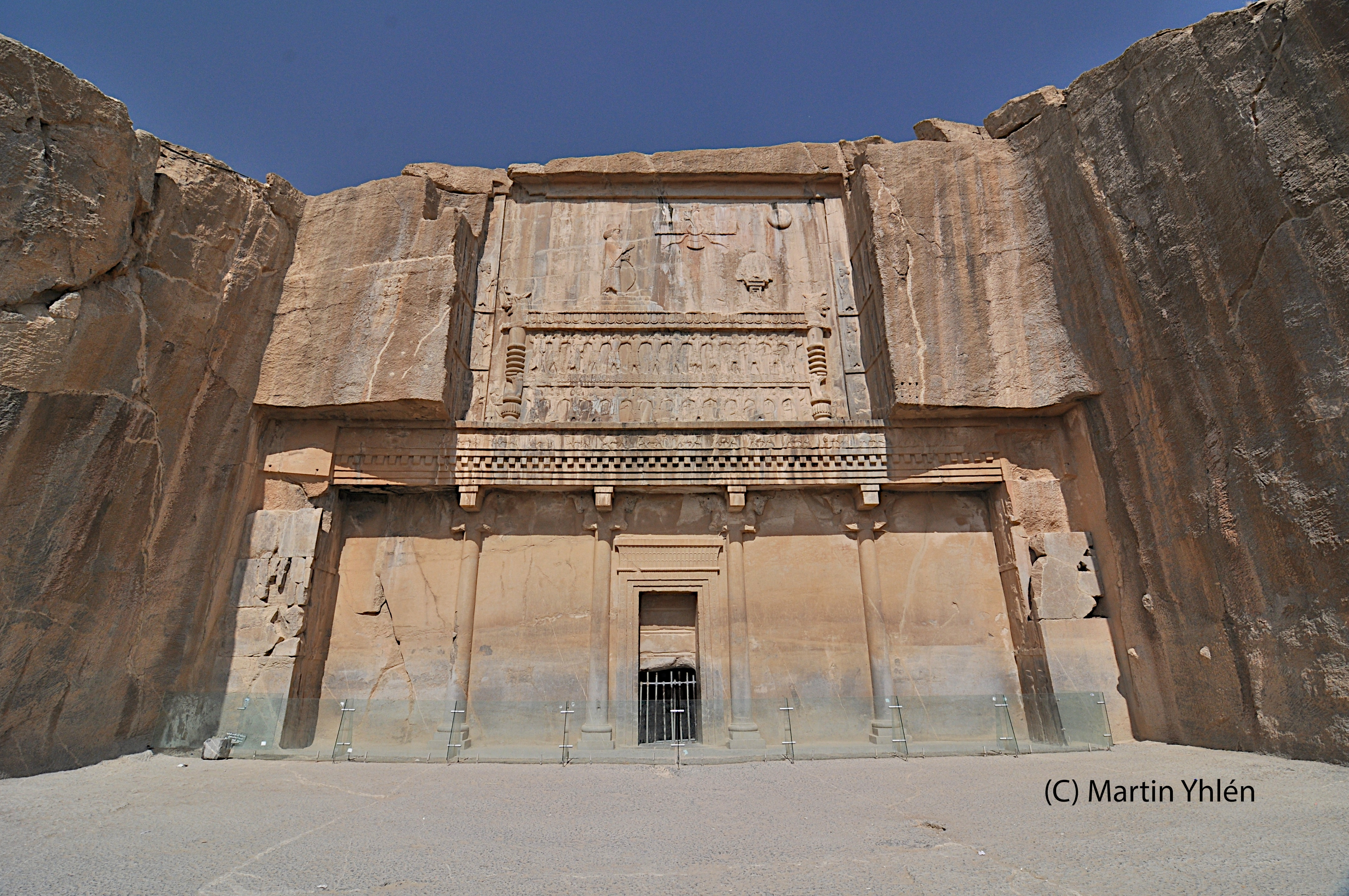
The tomb of Artaxerxes III in Persepolis

Many Achaemenid rulers built tombs for themselves. Naqsh-e Rostam, the most famous, is an ancient necropolis about 12 km north-west of Persepolis, where four of the dynasty's kings have tombs carved into the mountain: Darius I, Xerxes I, Artaxerxes I and Darius II. Other kings constructed their own tombs elsewhere.

Artaxerxes II and Artaxerxes III preferred to carve their tombs beside their spring capital Persepolis. The left tomb belongs to Artaxerxes II and the right tomb belongs to Artaxerxes III, the last Achaemenid king to have a tomb. The tomb of the founder of the Achaemenid dynasty, Cyrus the Great, was built in Pasargadae (now a world heritage site).

== Legacy ==
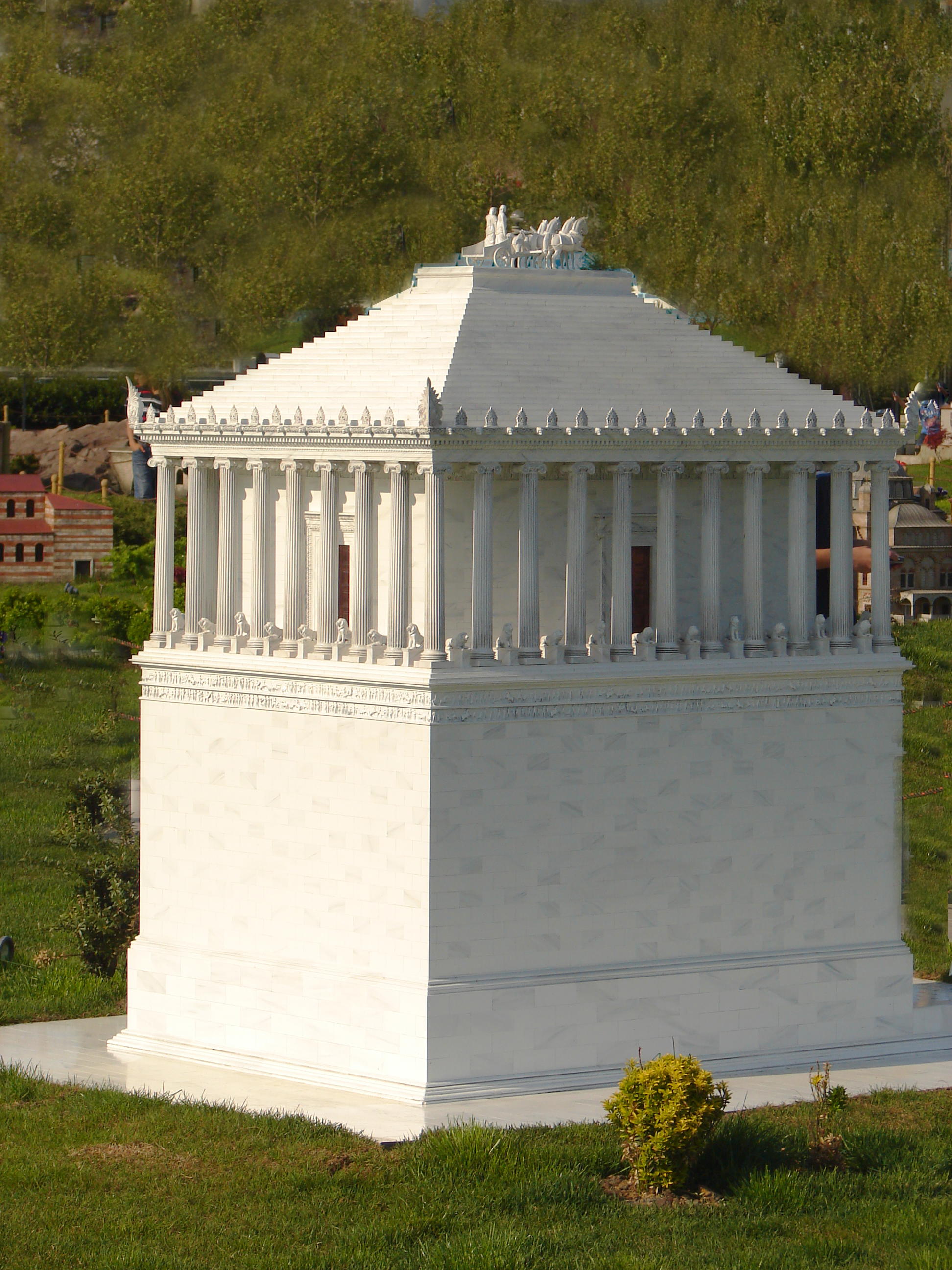
The Mausoleum at Halicarnassus, one of the Seven wonders of the ancient world, was built by Greek architects for the local Persian satrap of Caria, Mausolus (Scale model)

The Achaemenid Empire has been referred to as the first "world empire" as it contained in the words of Persian kings "many people and many languages". The diverse groups which made up the empire enjoyed a great deal of legal and cultural autonomy. The Achaemenid Empire has also left a lasting impression on the heritage and cultural identity of Asia and the Middle East, and influenced the development and structure of future empires. In fact, the Greeks, and later on the Romans, adopted the best features of the Persian method of governing an empire.

It was also during Achaemenid rule, roughly around 850-600 BCE that the terms "Hindu" (derived from Sindhu) and "Hind" (derived from Sindh) began to appear in speech and writing. The terms are widely used till this day.

The Persian model of governance was particularly formative in the expansion and maintenance of the Abbasid Caliphate, whose rule is widely considered the period of the Islamic Golden Age. Similar to the ancient Persians, the Abbasid dynasty established its empire's center in Mesopotamia, founding the new cities of Baghdad and Samarra near the historic site of Babylon. The dynasty drew significant support from the Persian aristocracy and integrated Persian language and architecture extensively into Islamic culture.

The Achaemenid Empire is noted in Western history as the antagonist of the Greek city-states during the Greco-Persian Wars and for the emancipation of the Jewish exiles in Babylon. The historical mark of the empire went far beyond its territorial and military influences and included cultural, social, technological and religious influences as well. For example, many Athenians adopted Achaemenid customs in their daily lives in a reciprocal cultural exchange, some being employed by or allied to the Persian kings. The impact of the Edict of Cyrus is mentioned in Judeo-Christian texts, and the empire was instrumental in the spread of Zoroastrianism as far east as China. The empire also set the tone for the politics, heritage and history of Iran (also known as Persia).

Historian Arnold Toynbee regarded Abbasid society as a "reintegration" or "reincarnation" of Achaemenid society, as the synthesis of Persian, Turkic and Islamic modes of governance and knowledge allowed for the spread of Persianate culture over a wide swath of Eurasia through the Turkic-origin Seljuq, Ottoman, Safavid and Mughal empires. Historian Bernard Lewis writes,

The work of Iranians can be seen in every field of cultural endeavor, including Arabic poetry, to which poets of Iranian origin composing their poems in Arabic made a very significant contribution. In a sense, Iranian Islam is a second advent of Islam itself, a new Islam sometimes referred to as Islam-i-Ajam. It was this Persian Islam, rather than the original Arab Islam, that was brought to new areas and new peoples: to the Turks, first in Central Asia and then in the Middle East in the country which came to be called Turkey, and of course to India. The Ottoman Turks brought a form of Iranian civilization to the walls of Vienna. [...] By the time of the great Mongol invasions of the thirteenth century, Iranian Islam had become not only an important component; it had become a dominant element in Islam itself, and for several centuries the main centers of the Islamic power and civilization were in countries that were, if not Iranian, at least marked by Iranian civilization ... The major centers of Islam in the late medieval and early modern periods, the centers of both political and cultural power, such as India, Central Asia, Iran, Turkey, were all part of this Iranian civilization.

Georg W. F. Hegel in his work The Philosophy of History introduces the Persian Empire as the "first empire that passed away" and its people as the "first historical people" in history. According to his account:

The Persian Empire is an empire in the modern sense—like that which existed in Germany, and the great imperial realm under the sway of Napoleon; for we find it consisting of a number of states, which are indeed dependent, but which have retained their own individuality, their manners, and laws. The general enactments, binding upon all, did not infringe upon their political and social idiosyncrasies, but even protected and maintained them; so that each of the nations that constitute the whole, had its own form of constitution. As light illuminates everything—imparting to each object a peculiar vitality—so the Persian Empire extends over a multitude of nations, and leaves to each one its particular character. Some have even kings of their own; each one its distinct language, arms, way of life and customs. All this diversity coexists harmoniously under the impartial dominion of Light ... a combination of peoples—leaving each of them free. Thereby, a stop is put to that barbarism and ferocity with which the nations had been wont to carry on their destructive feuds.

Will Durant, the American historian and philosopher, during one of his speeches, "Persia in the History of Civilization", as an address before the Iran–America Society in Tehran on 21 April 1948, stated:

For thousands of years Persians have been creating beauty. Sixteen centuries before Christ there went from these regions or near it ... You have been here a kind of watershed of civilization, pouring your blood and thought and art and religion eastward and westward into the world ... I need not rehearse for you again the achievements of your Achaemenid period. Then for the first time in known history an empire almost as extensive as the United States received an orderly government, a competence of administration, a web of swift communications, a security of movement by men and goods on majestic roads, equalled before our time only by the zenith of Imperial Rome.

== List of Rulers ==
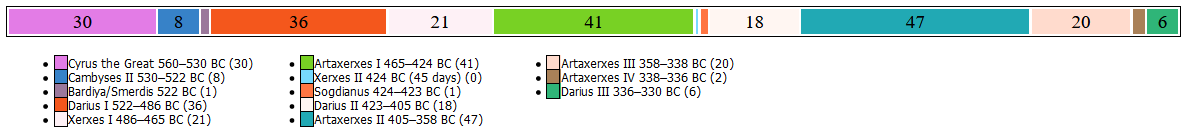

Name	Image	Comments	Dates
Achaemenes		First ruler of the Achaemenid kingdom and founder of the dynasty. Attested to only by the Behistun Inscription.	705 BC
Teispes		Son of Achaemenes. Attested to only by the Behistun Inscription.	640 BC
Cyrus I		Son of Teispes, first Achaemenid ruler with attestation.	580 BC
Cambyses I		Son of Cyrus I and father of Cyrus II. No records from his reign survive.	550 BC
Cyrus II the Great		Transformed the dynasty into an empire; King of the "four corners of the world"	560–530 BC
Cambyses II		King of Persia in addition to Pharaoh of Egypt	530–522 BC
Bardiya		King of Persia, allegedly an impostor named Gaumata.	522 BC
Darius I the Great		King of Persia in addition to Pharaoh of Egypt. Cousin of Cambyses II and Bardiya.	522–486 BC
Xerxes I		King of Persia in addition to Pharaoh of Egypt	486–465 BC
Artaxerxes I		King of Persia in addition to Pharaoh of Egypt	465–424 BC
Xerxes II		King of Persia in addition to Pharaoh of Egypt. Assassinated by his half-brother and successor, Sogdianus.	424 BC (45 days)
Sogdianus		King of Persia in addition to Pharaoh of Egypt	424–423 BC
Darius II		King of Persia in addition to Pharaoh of Egypt. His birth name was Ochus.	423–405 BC
Artaxerxes II		King of Persia. Ruling for 47 years, Artaxerxes II was the longest reigning Achaemenid king. His birth name was Arses.	405–358 BC
Artaxerxes III		King of Persia in addition to Pharaoh of Egypt, having re-conquered the land after it was lost during the reign of Artaxerxes II. His birth name was Ochus.	358–338 BC
Artaxerxes IV		King of Persia in addition to Pharaoh of Egypt. His birth name was Arses.	338–336 BC
Darius III		King of Persia in addition to Pharaoh of Egypt; last ruler of the empire. His birth name was either Artashata or Codomannus.	336–330 BC

== See also ==
- List of rulers of the pre-Achaemenid kingdoms of Iran
- List of Zoroastrian states and dynasties
