= Charles Taylor =

Charles Taylor most often refers to:

- Charles Taylor (Liberian politician) (born 1948), warlord and president of Liberia
- Charles Taylor (philosopher) (born 1931), Canadian philosopher and social theorist

Charles, Charlie, or Chuck Taylor may also refer to:

== Journalists ==
- Charles H. Taylor (publisher) (1846–1921), American newspaper publisher and politician
- Charles P. B. Taylor (1935–1997), Canadian journalist, author, and horsebreeder
- Chuck Taylor (journalist, born 1957), American journalist
- Chuck Taylor (music journalist) (born 1962), American music journalist

== Military personnel ==
- Charles Taylor (cavalryman) (1840–1899), American cavalryman during the American Indian Wars
- Charles Carroll Taylor (1917–1945), American naval pilot, leader of ill-fated Flight 19
- Charles Chatworthy Wood Taylor (1792–1856), painter, engineer, mariner, and military officer
- Charles Frederick Taylor (1840–1863), American soldier and Union Army colonel
- Charles Stanfield Taylor (1808–1865), English-born soldier and politician
- Charles Taylor (Royal Navy officer) (1863–1915), naval officer and Wales international rugby union player

== Musicians and performing artists ==
- Charles Taylor (actor), American actor
- Charles H. Taylor (lyricist) (1859–1907), British lyricist
- Rip Taylor (Charles Elmer Taylor Jr., 1935–2019), American actor and comedian
- Charles W. Taylor (1800–1874), American actor and dramatist
- Chuck Taylor (rapper), American rapper and actor

== Politicians ==
- Charles Taylor (Australian politician) (1861–1944), member of the Queensland Legislative Assembly
- Charles Taylor (Conservative politician) (1910–1989), English politician and MP for Eastbourne
- Charles Taylor (MP for Totnes) (1693–1766), English politician
- Charles Taylor (North Carolina politician) (born 1941), former US congressman from North Carolina
- Charles E. Taylor (politician) (1884–1967), member of the Montana State Senate
- Charles H. Taylor (Michigan politician) (1813–1889), American politician who served as the Michigan Secretary of State
- Charles H. Taylor (publisher) (1846–1921), American newspaper publisher and politician
- Charles John Taylor (1826–1897), New Zealand politician
- Charles Keith Taylor (born 1931), Canadian politician
- Charles McArther Emmanuel or Chuckie Taylor (born 1978), Liberian paramilitary leader, son of Liberian president Charles Taylor
- Charles Simeon Taylor (1851–1913), Wisconsin politician
- Charles Wiley Taylor (1786–1865), Connecticut politician
- Charles A. Taylor (Oklahoma politician)

== Scholars ==
- Charles Taylor (Hebraist) (1840–1908), English Hebraist
- Charles Taylor (physicist) (1922–2002), British physicist
- Charles E. Taylor (engineer) (1924–2017), American engineer
- Charles Richard Taylor (1939–1995), American biologist
- Charles V. Taylor (1918–2009), Australian linguist
- Charles Vincent Taylor (1885–1946), American biologist

== Sportspeople ==
=== American football players and coaches ===
- Rick Taylor (American football) (Charles F. Taylor, born 1941), American college football coach and athletic director
- Charley Taylor (1941–2022), American professional football wide receiver
- Chuck Taylor (American football) (1920–1994), American college football player, coach, and administrator

=== Association football players ===
- Charles Asampong Taylor (born 1981), Ghanaian football player
- Charlie Taylor (footballer, born 1985), English footballer
- Charlie Taylor (footballer, born 1993), English footballer

=== Cricketers ===
- Charles Taylor (cricketer, born 1816) (1816–1869), English cricketer
- Charles Taylor (cricketer, born 1881) (1881–1960), English cricketer
- Charles Taylor (cricketer, born 1966), English former cricketer
- Charlie Taylor (cricketer) (1918–2000), Barbadian cricketer

=== Other sportspeople ===
- Charles Taylor (Royal Navy officer) (1863–1915), naval officer and Wales international rugby union player
- Bud Taylor (Charles Bernard Taylor, 1903–1962), American boxer
- C. I. Taylor (Charles Isham Taylor, 1875–1922), American baseball player and manager and co-founder of the Negro National League
- Charlie Taylor (footballer, born 1878) (1878–1960), Australian rules footballer for Melbourne, Carlton, and St Kilda
- Charlie Taylor (footballer, born 1884) (1884–1953), Australian rules footballer for Fitzroy
- Charlie Taylor (rugby league) (1921–2013), English rugby league footballer
- Chuck Taylor (baseball) (1942–2018), American baseball player
- Chuck Taylor (salesman) (1901–1969), American basketball player and shoe salesman
- Chuck Taylor (wrestler) (born 1986), American professional wrestler

== Others ==
- Charles Taylor (calico printer and dyer) (died 1816), English businessman, pioneer of textiles bleaching with chlorine
- Charles Taylor (engraver) (1756–1823), English engraver
- Charles Taylor (inventor), inventor of an ice cream freezer and founder of Taylor Company
- Charlie Taylor (mechanic) (1868–1956), American mechanic for the Wright brothers, built the first aircraft engine
- Charles Taylor (priest) (1953–2024), English Anglican priest
- Charles Taylor Jr. (born 1943), American author
- Charles L. Taylor (1857–1922), American industrialist and friend of Andrew Carnegie
- Charles William Gray Taylor (1879–1950), Scottish Presbyterian minister

== See also ==
- Charles Tayler (disambiguation)
- Myron Charles Taylor (1874–1959), American industrialist and diplomat
