= History of heraldry =

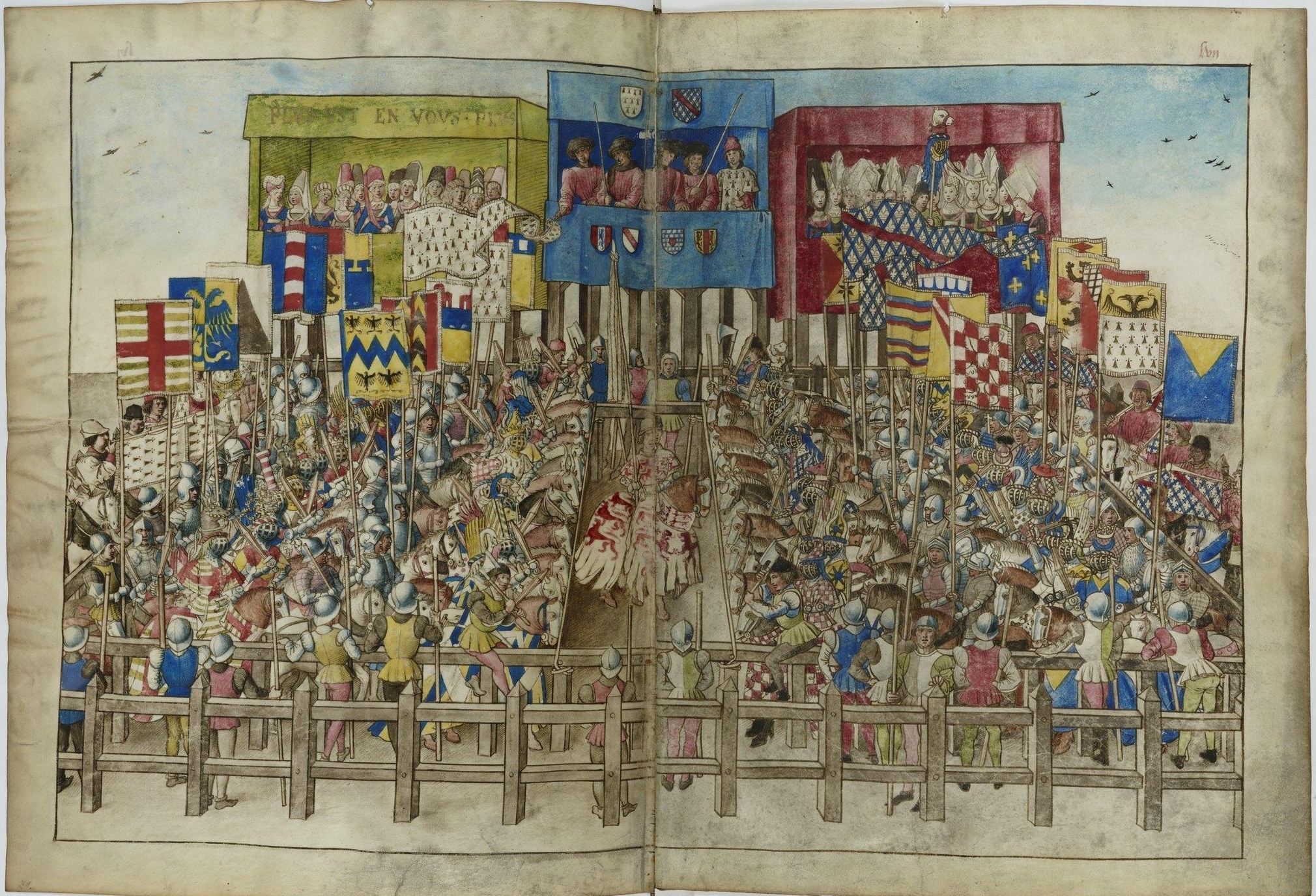
Depiction of a late medieval knightly tournament from King René's Tournament Book (1460s). The two teams stand ready, each side has 24 knights, all with heraldic surcoats and caparisons, and each accompanied by a banner-bearer with a heraldic flag. There is a central spectators' box for the four judges, where the heraldic shields of the competitors are displayed, the two teams being led by the dukes of Brittany and Bourbon, respectively, and one spectator box on each side for the ladies; inscribed over the boxes is plus est en vous, the heraldic motto of the Gruuthuse family of Bruges, attributed to tournament between Jean III de Gruuthuse and Jean de Ghistelles held in 1393. The two dukes can be seen facing each other in the center of the front lines, each with a personal heraldic flag as well with a larger flag of the same design representing their team. The chief herald is also on horseback, between the two teams, wearing his own heraldic colours.

Heraldry is the system of visual identification of rank and pedigree which developed in the European High Middle Ages. It was closely associated with the courtly culture of chivalry, Latin Christianity, the Crusades, feudal aristocracy, and monarchy of the time. Heraldic tradition fully developed in the 13th century, and it flourished and developed further during the Late Middle Ages and the Early Modern period. Originally limited to nobility, heraldry is adopted by wealthy commoners in the Late Middle Ages (Burgher arms). Specific traditions of Ecclesiastical heraldry also develop in the late medieval period. Coats of arms of noble families, often after their extinction, becomes attached to the territories they used to own, giving rise to municipal coats of arms by the 16th century.

Western heraldry spread beyond its core territory of Latin Christendom in the 17th century, Western heraldic traditions being adopted in the Russian Empire. With colonialism, the use of heraldry has spread to other continents, e.g. Africa and the Americas.

While some concepts associated with heraldry, such as nobility and monarchy, have declined in favour of Republicanism in the 19th to 20th centuries, heraldry as a whole continues to flourish, with the art form today enjoying greater prevalence than ever in countries with strong heraldic traditions. Even elsewhere, elements inherited from heraldic tradition are frequently used in national flags and emblems around the world.

== Precursors ==
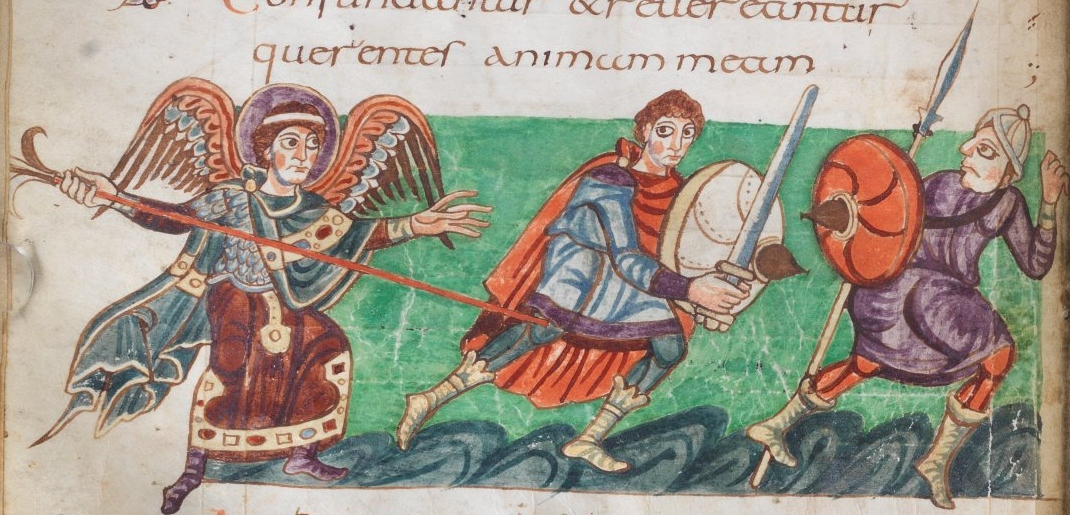
Depiction of Carolingian-era round shields (Stuttgart Psalter, 9th century). The spiral patterns represent iron bracing reinforcing the shield.

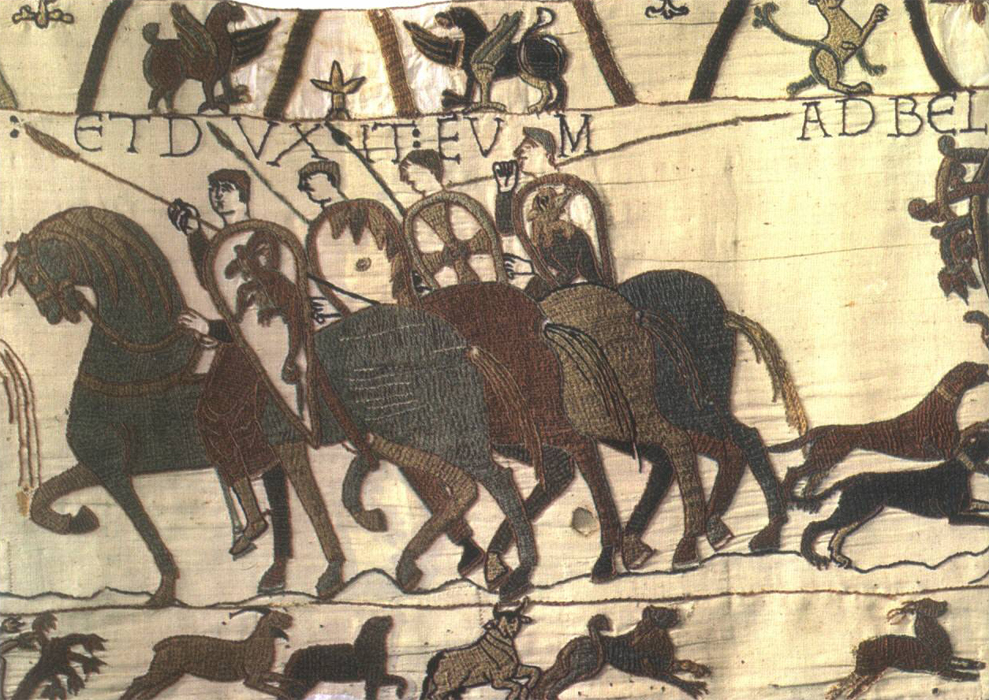
Proto-heraldic shield decorations shown in the Bayeux Tapestry (c. 1077).

Traditions of field signs, personal emblems or seals go back to at least the Bronze Age. The ekphrastic description of shield designs in particular is found as a topos in classical literature. Units of the Roman army were sometimes identified by distinctive markings on their shields.

Heraldry developed in the high medieval period, based on earlier, "pre-heraldic" or "ante-heraldic", traditions of visual identification by means of seals, field signs, emblems used on coins, etc. Notably, lions that would subsequently appear in 12th-century coats of arms of European nobility have pre-figurations in the animal style of ancient art (specifically the style of Scythian art as it developed from c. the 7th century BC).

Western heraldry is an innovation of the 12th century. Certain members of the high nobility began to display animals, especially lions, on their shields beginning in c. the 1140s. Prior to this, western military shields of the 11th to early 12th century did sometimes show simple decorations, but not apparently tied to the personal identification of the bearer.

The Bayeux Tapestry, illustrating the Norman invasion of England in 1066, and probably commissioned about 1077, when the cathedral of Bayeux was rebuilt, depicts a number of shields of various shapes and designs, many of which are plain, while others are decorated with dragons, crosses, or other typically heraldic figures. Yet no individual is depicted twice bearing the same arms, nor are any of the descendants of the various persons depicted known to have borne devices resembling those in the tapestry. Frankish or German round shields of the 11th century (Ottonian, Salian) are sometimes depicted with simple geometric ornamentation, but not with figurative emblems.

Similarly, an account of the French knights at the court of the Byzantine emperor Alexius I at the beginning of the twelfth century describes their shields of polished metal, utterly devoid of heraldic design. A Spanish manuscript from 1109 describes both plain and decorated shields, none of which appears to have been heraldic. The Abbey of St. Denis contained a window commemorating the knights who embarked on the Second Crusade in 1147, and was probably made soon after the event; but Montfaucon's illustration of the window before it was destroyed shows no heraldic design on any of the shields.

== Proto-heraldry (12th century) ==
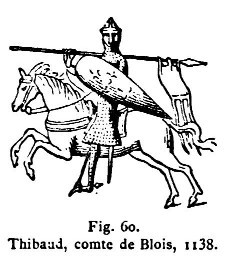
Drawing of the equestrian seal of Theobald III, Count of Blois, dated 1138. Traces of an ornamental cross design are visible on the shield.

The 12th-century tradition is mostly preserved in the form of the equestrian seals popular at the time which show the nobleman as a fully armed warrior on horseback. Early equestrian seals show plain shields. From the mid 12th century, proto-heraldic designs are sometimes shown, but the shield is shown naturally, as part of the knight's armament, and is often seen in profile or partially obscured. The equestrian seal of Enguerrand (Ingelram), count of Saint-Pol (1130s or 1140s) still shows a plain shield, but what would later become heraldic charges (in this case, sheaves of corn) are shown arranged around the horse. Seals displaying actual heraldic shields appear by the very end of the 12th century or the early years of the 13th century.

Seals with elements of a distinctly heraldic character begin to appear in the second third of the 12th century. A number of seals dating from between 1135 and 1155 appear to show the adoption of heraldic devices in England, France, Germany, Spain, and Italy. A notable example of an early armorial seal is attached to a charter granted by Philip I, Count of Flanders, in 1164. Seals from the latter part of the eleventh and early twelfth centuries show no evidence of heraldic symbolism, but by the end of the twelfth century, seals are uniformly heraldic in nature.

Among the oldest equestrian seals with armorials are those of Henry the Lion of the House of Welf, duke of Saxony (1142–1180) and Bavaria (1156–1180). A total of seven seals of Henry's are known. Of these, only the second shows a recognizable lion displayed on his shield. This seal is attached to two documents dated to 1146. It is possible that the lion was also on the first seal (c. 1142), but it is no longer recognizable. An equestrian seal of similar antiquity is that of Ottokar III of Styria, dated 1160, with an early form of the Styrian panther on his shield.

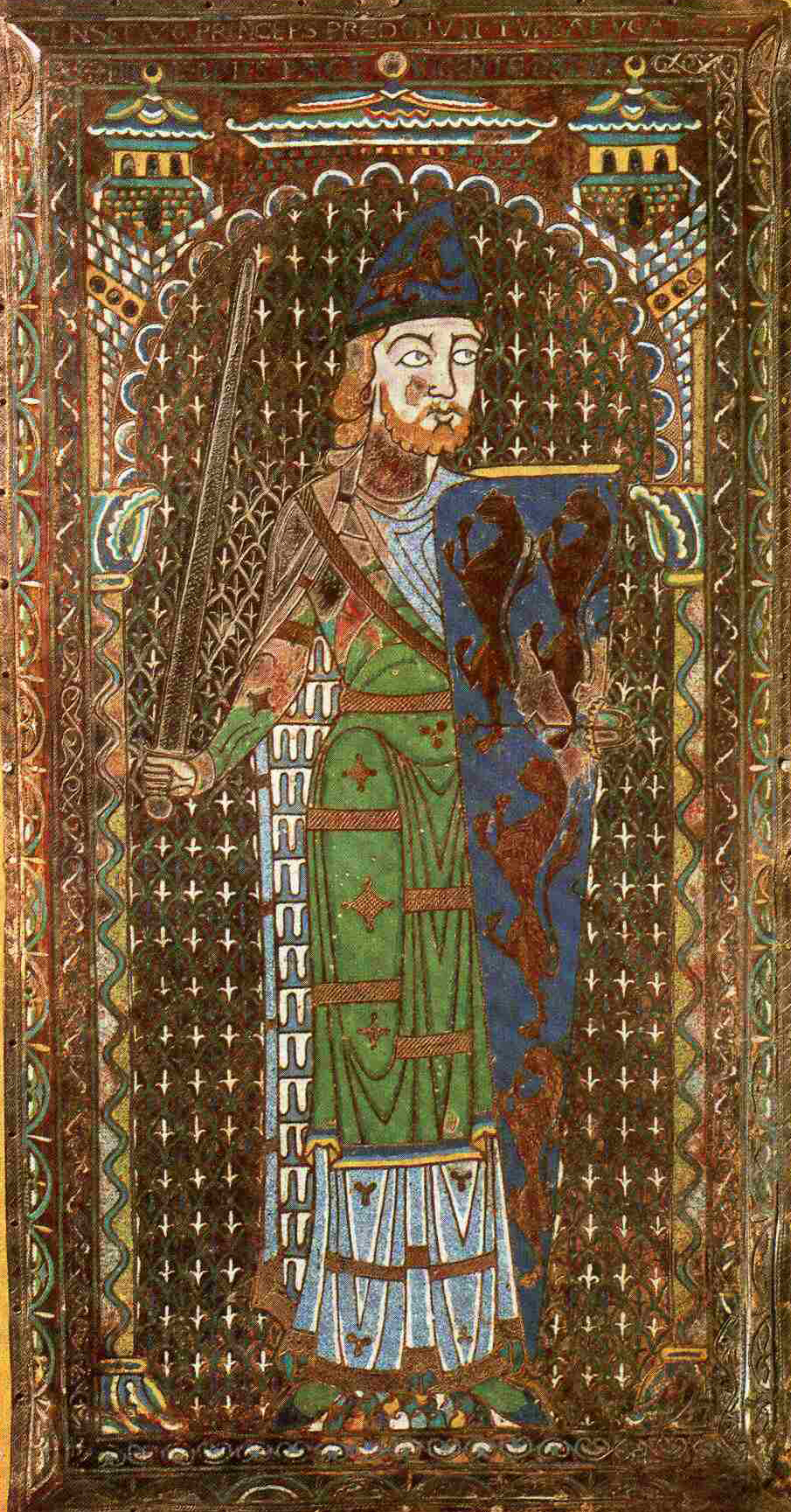
Enamel from the tomb of Geoffrey Plantagenet, Count of Anjou, showing his shield in profile, with four out of what were presumably six lions visible (six lions are on the shield of the effigy of his grandson William Longespée, d. 1226).

The oldest extant depiction of a coloured armoury can be seen on the tomb of Geoffrey Plantagenet, Count of Anjou, who died in 1151. An enamel, probably commissioned by Geoffrey's widow between 1155 and 1160, depicts him carrying a blue shield decorated with six golden lions rampant. He wears a blue helmet adorned with another lion, and his cloak is lined in vair. A medieval chronicle states that Geoffrey was given a shield of this description when he was knighted by his father-in-law, Henry I, in 1128; but this account probably dates to about 1175. The earliest evidence of the association of lions with the English crown is a seal bearing two lions passant, used by the future King John during the lifetime of his father, Henry II, who died in 1189. Since Henry was the son of Geoffrey Plantagenet, it seems reasonable to suppose that the adoption of lions as an heraldic emblem by Henry or his sons might have been inspired by Geoffrey's shield. John's elder brother, Richard the Lionheart, who succeeded his father on the throne, is believed to have been the first to have borne the arms of three lions passant-guardant, still the arms of England, having earlier used two lions rampant combatant, which arms may also have belonged to his father. Richard is also credited with having originated the English crest of a lion statant (now statant-guardant).

Early mention of heraldic shields in Middle High German literature also dates to the 12th century. Shield designs are described in the Kaiserchronik (c. 1150–1170), such as the boar carried by the Romans, as well as, in isolated cases, in the Rolandslied (c. 1115), König Rother (c. 1150), Veldecke's Eneas (c. 1170), and Hartmann's Erec (c. 1185). These appear in the larger context of describing an armed protagonist, and are not yet tied to the bearer's pedigree.

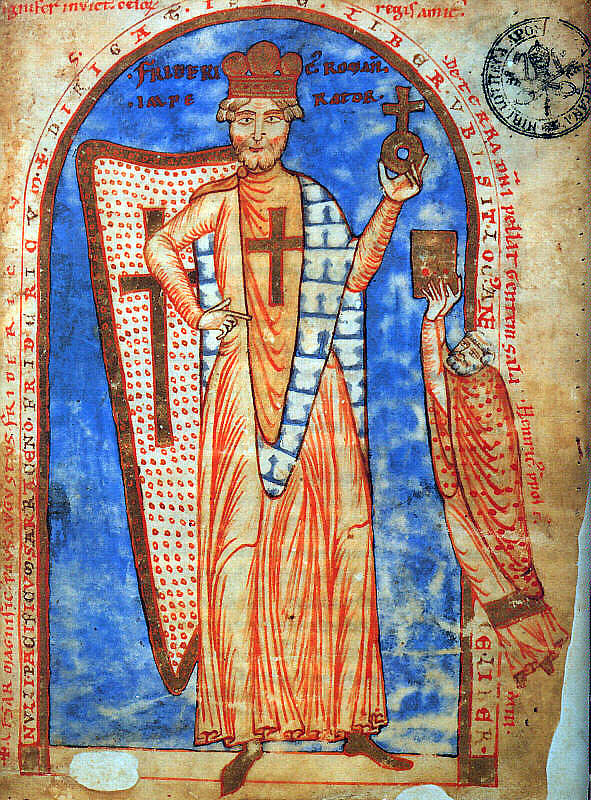
Depiction of emperor Frederick Barbarossa as a Crusader (c. 1188). The cross symbol worn on the shield and surcoat at this time is not a heraldic charge identifying the bearer but a field sign worn by all participants in the Crusade.

At least two distinctive features of heraldry are generally accepted as products of the Crusades: the surcoat, an outer garment worn over the armor to protect the wearer from the heat of the sun, was often decorated with the same devices that appeared on a knight's shield. It is from this garment that the phrase "coat of arms" is derived. Also the lambrequin, or mantling, that depends from the helmet and frames the shield in modern heraldry, began as a practical covering for the helmet and the back of the neck during the Crusades, serving much the same function as the surcoat. Its slashed or scalloped edge, today rendered as billowing flourishes, is thought to have originated from hard wearing in the field, or as a means of deadening a sword blow and perhaps entangling the attacker's weapon.

== Medieval heraldry ==
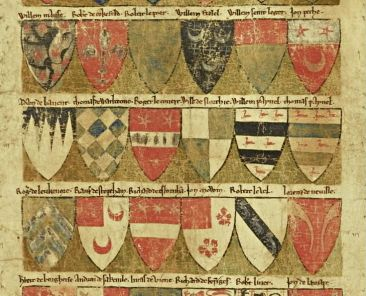
Dering Roll, c. 1270, Dover, one of the oldest extant rolls of arms, showing the coats of arms as yet without helmets or any other achievements.

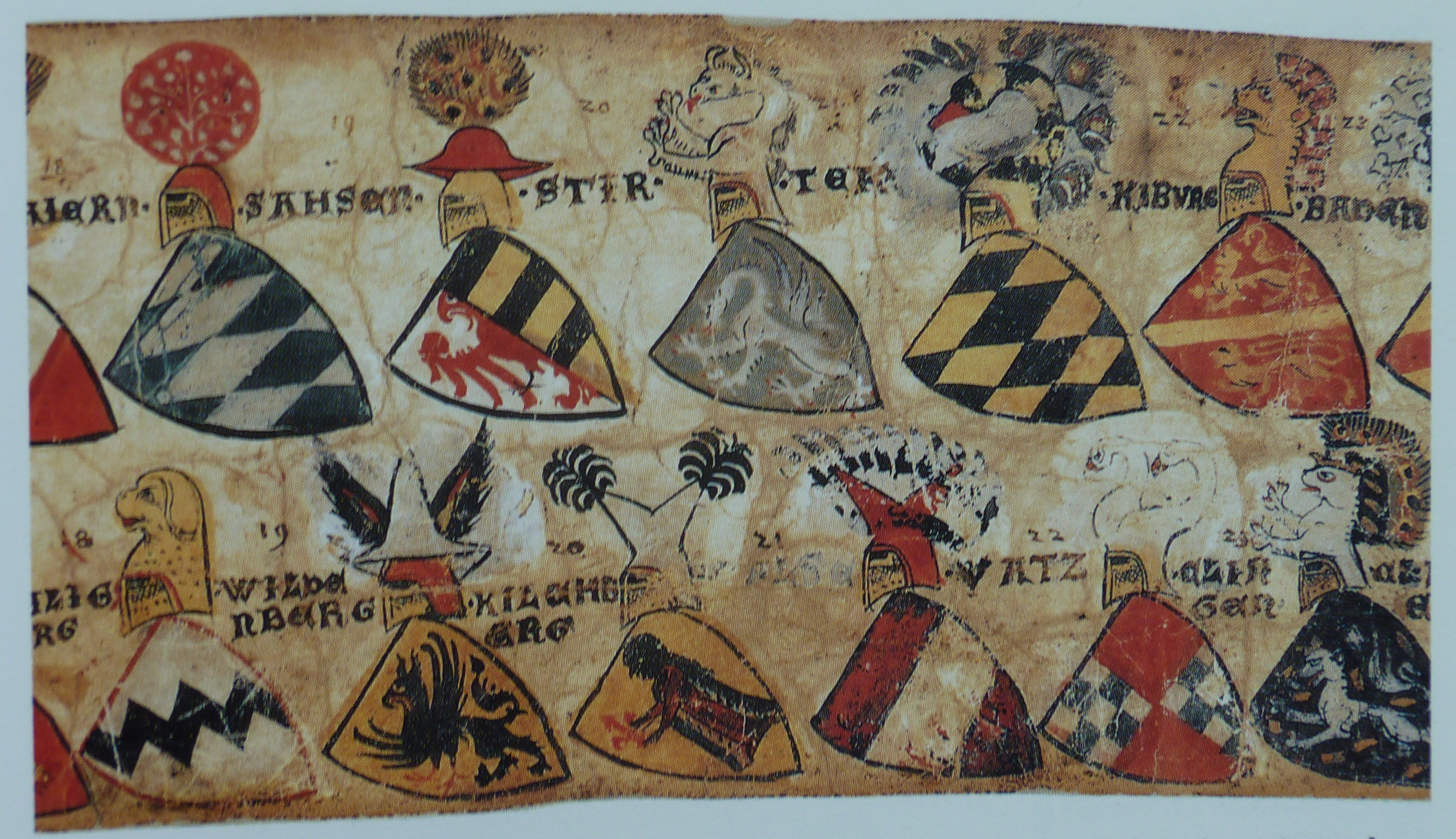
Part of the Zürich armorial (c. 1340), an early example of the tradition of representing coats of arms with a representation of helmet and crest.

=== Terminology ===
The origin of the term heraldry itself (Middle English heraldy, Old French hiraudie), can be placed in the context of the early forms of the knightly tournaments in the 12th century. Combatants wore full armour, and identified themselves by wearing their emblems on their shields. A herald (Old French heraut, from a Frankish *hariwald "commander of an army") was an officer who would announce the competitors.

Originally a type of messenger employed by noblemen, heralds assumed the responsibility of learning and knowing the rank, pedigree, and heraldic devices of various knights and lords, as well as the rules and protocols governing the design and description, or blazoning of arms, and the precedence of their bearers. As early as the late thirteenth century, certain heralds in the employ of monarchs were given the title "King of Heralds", which eventually became "King of Arms."

The term coat of arms in origin refers to the surcoat with heraldic designs worn by combatants, especially in the knightly tournament, in Old French cote a armer. The sense is transferred to the heraldic design itself in Middle English, in the mid-14th century.

=== Heraldic shield ===
By about the 1230s, the shields used by cavalry were almost triangular in shape, referred to as heater shields. Such a shield is preserved, the shield of Konrad von Thüringen, dated c. 1230, showing the lion barry of the Ludovingians. This heater-shaped form was used in warfare during the apogee of the Age of Chivalry, and it becomes the classic heraldic shield, or escutcheon, at about the time of the Battle of Crecy (1346) and the founding of the Order of the Garter (1348), when heraldry had become a fully developed system. All medieval rolls of arms, from the late 13th and throughout the 14th to 15th century, almost exclusively use this shield shape.

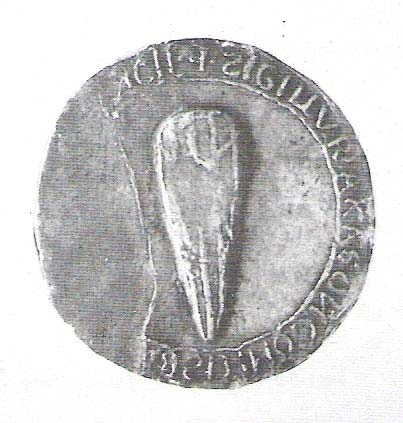
Counterseal of Alfonso II of Aragon, dated 1187: one of the earliest depiction of a "heraldic shield" (depiction of the shield design in isolation of the full depiction of the armed bearer), in this case showing an early form of the Pales of Aragon. The shield at this time still has the "kite" shape.

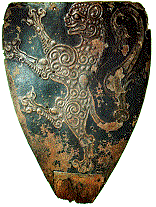
Shield of Seedorf (late 12th century), the oldest extant medieval shield, showing a lion rampant. Preserved in Seedorf monastery, Uri, Switzerland. In origin still of the kite shield type, the top of the shield has been cut off at a later date to approximate the 13th-century "heater" shape.

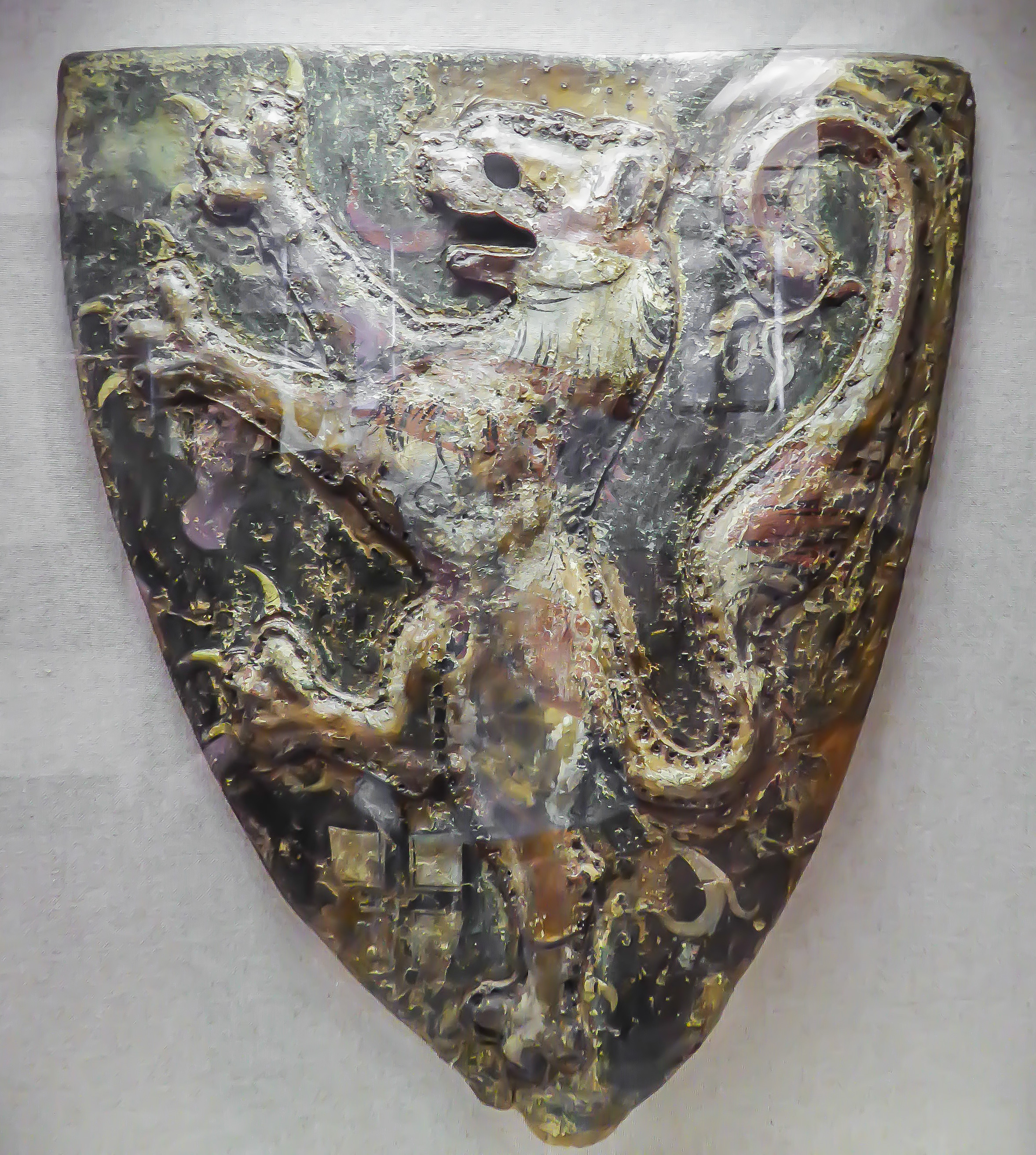
Shield of Konrad von Thüringen (c. 1230), showing the lion barry of the Ludovingians (later known as the "Lion of Hesse").

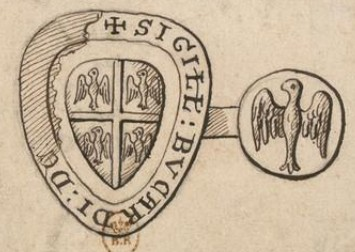
Heraldic seal of Bouchard of Marly, dated 1225. A fully developed heraldic shield is shown on the obverse side of the seal, replacing the depiction of the fully armed knight as it were pars pro toto.

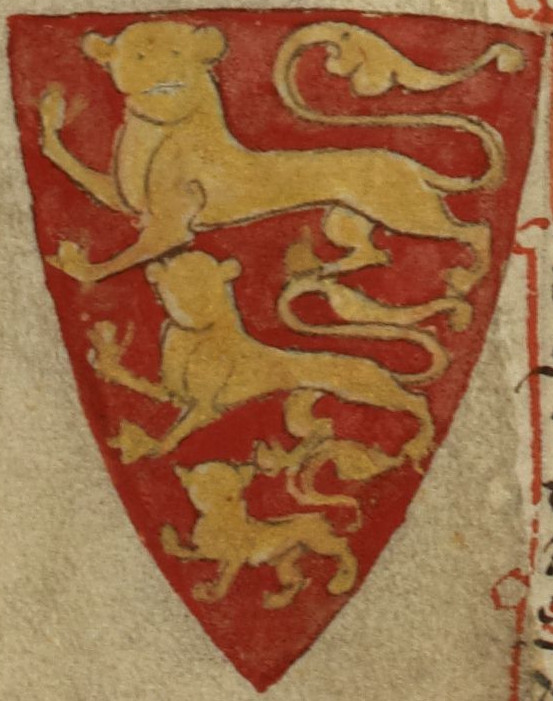
Matthew Paris in Historia Anglorum and Chronica Majora (c. 1250) uses miniatures of heraldic shields to represent the accession and deaths of kings, shown here are the three lions passants guardants or attributed to William I and his successors Henry I, Stephen, Henry II, John and Henry III, later (14th century) used as the Royal Arms of England.

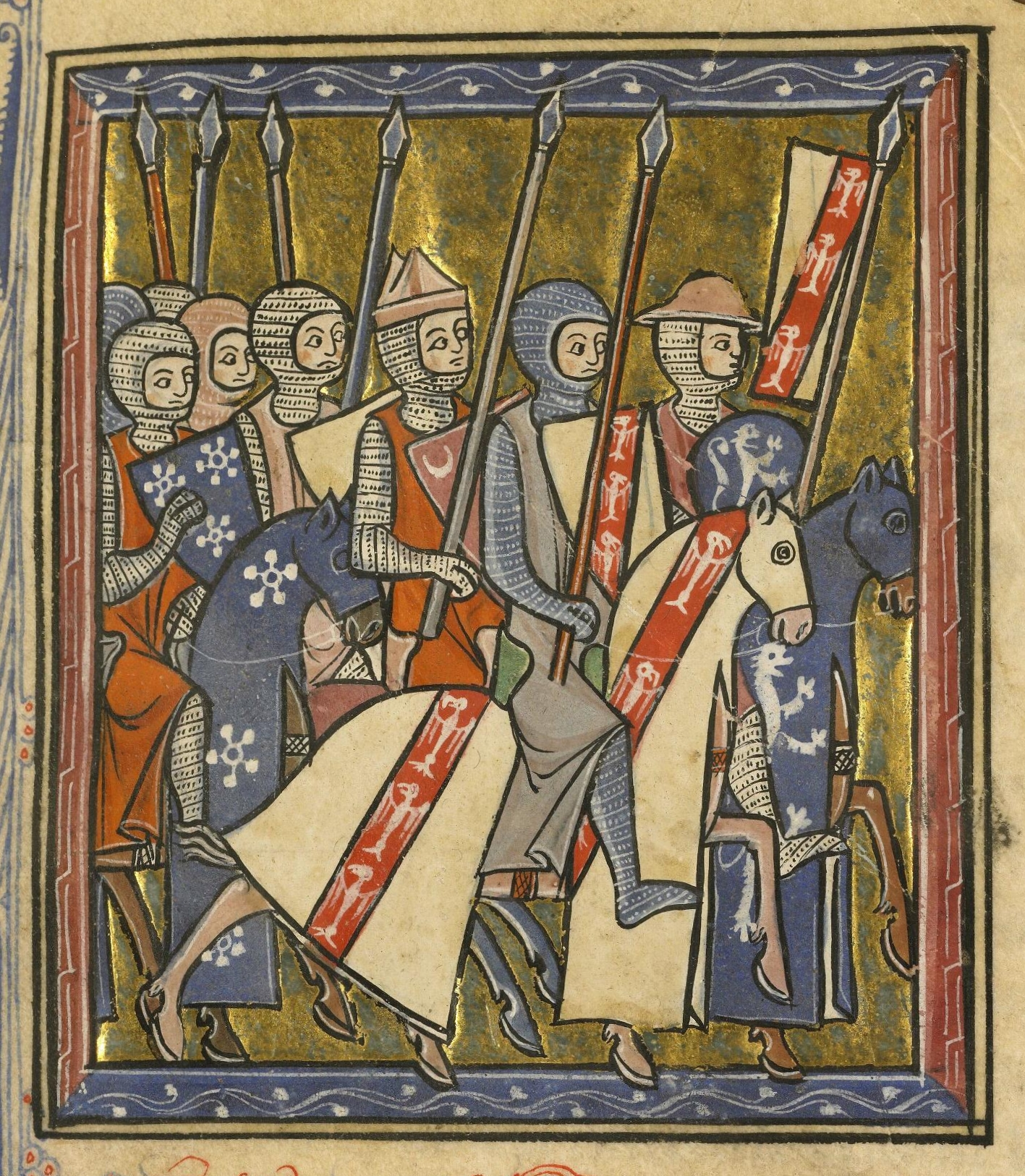
Miniature depicting the First Crusade from a manuscripts of Histoire d'Outremer (dated 1287). The image shows Godfrey of Bouillon and Adhemar of Le Puy. Godfrey is displaying the arms of Lorraine, a bend gules with three alerions argent. Adhemar is wearing a bishop's mitre and displaying a crescent on his shield.

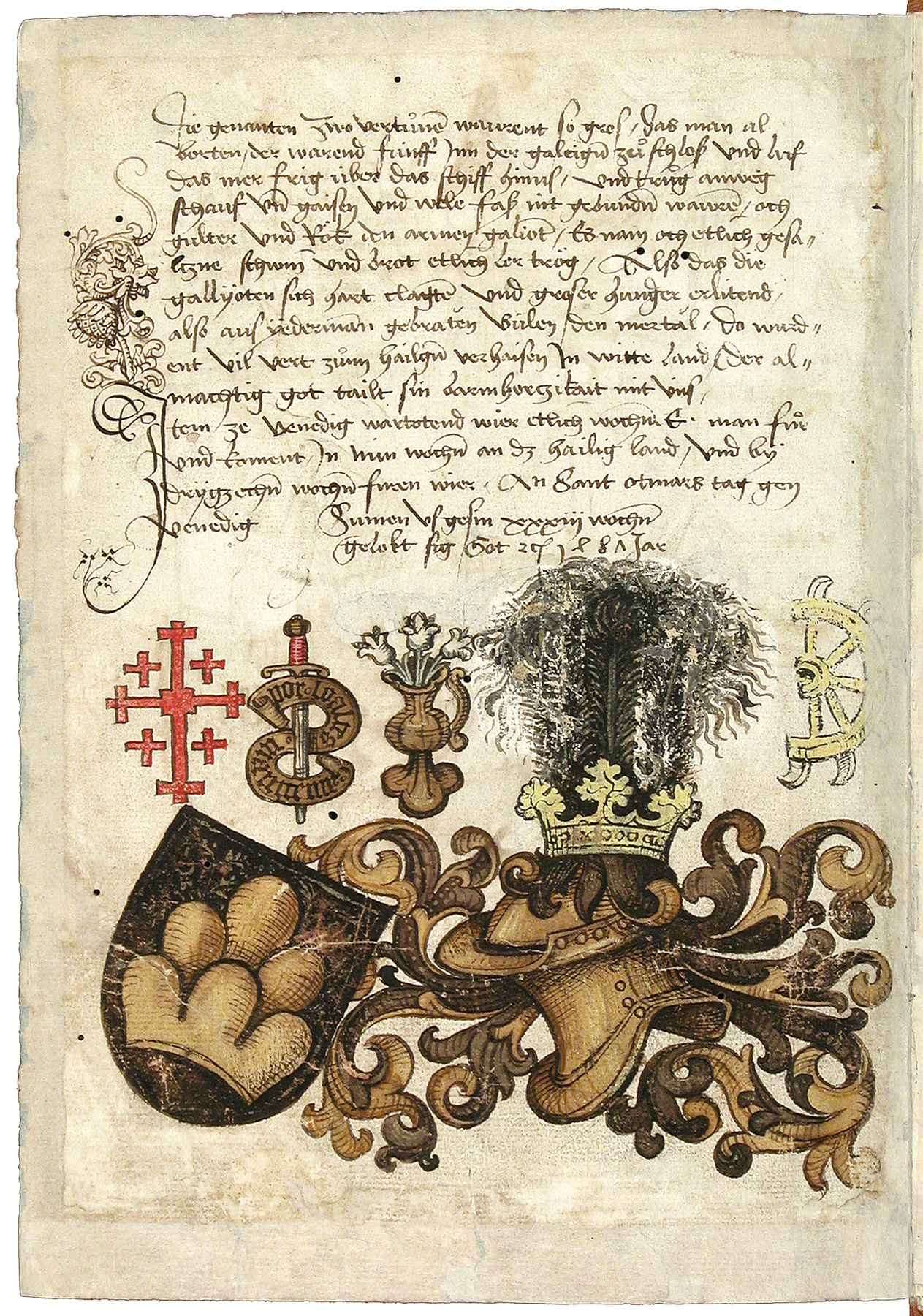
Example of burgher arms at the end of the medieval period, Conrad Grünenberg (1487) shows his arms of two green trimounts along with the emblems of the "orders" for which he acquired a claim to membership on his pilgrimage to Jerusalem, the Jerusalem cross for the Order of the Holy Sepulchre, the sword and scroll of the Order of the Sword, the vase with flowers emblem of the Order of the Jar and the half-wheel of Saint Catherine.

=== Division of the field ===
Coats of arms of the 13th century in some cases already include marks of cadency to distinguish descendants, but they mostly still do without division of the field to indicate descent from more than one lineage. An exception is the coat of arms of Castile and León, showing the arms of Castile (the yellow castle) quartered with the arms of León (the purple lion) in the late 13th century Camden Roll and Segar's Roll. This practice becomes much more common in the late medieval period. For example, the arms of Eric of Pomerania as king of the Kalmar Union (r. 1396–1439) combine five coats of arms, for Denmark, Sweden, the House of Bjälbo, Pomerania and Norway, quartered by a cross gules and with a central inescutcheon. In the later 15th century, holders of ecclesiastical office would quarter their family arms with those of the order or diocese they represented. Thus Pierre d'Aubusson as grand master of the Knights of Malta quartered his family arms with the Maltese cross; bishop Hugo von Hohenlandenberg quartered his family arms with those of the prince-bishopric of Constance.

=== Heraldic authorities ===
By the middle of the fourteenth century, the principle that only a single individual was entitled to bear a particular coat of arms was generally accepted, and disputes over the ownership of arms seems to have led to gradual establishment of heraldic authorities to regulate their use. The earliest known work of heraldic jurisprudence, De Insigniis et Armis, was written about 1350 by Bartolus de Saxoferrato, a professor of law at the University of Padua. The most celebrated armorial dispute in English heraldry is that of Scrope v Grosvenor (1390), in which two different men claimed the right to bear azure, a bend or. The continued proliferation of arms, and the number of disputes arising from different men assuming the same arms, led Henry V to issue a proclamation in 1419, forbidding all those who had not borne arms at the Battle of Agincourt from assuming arms, except by inheritance or a grant from the crown.

== Early modern heraldry ==
The "Quaternion eagle", representing the estates of the Holy Roman Empire (1510).

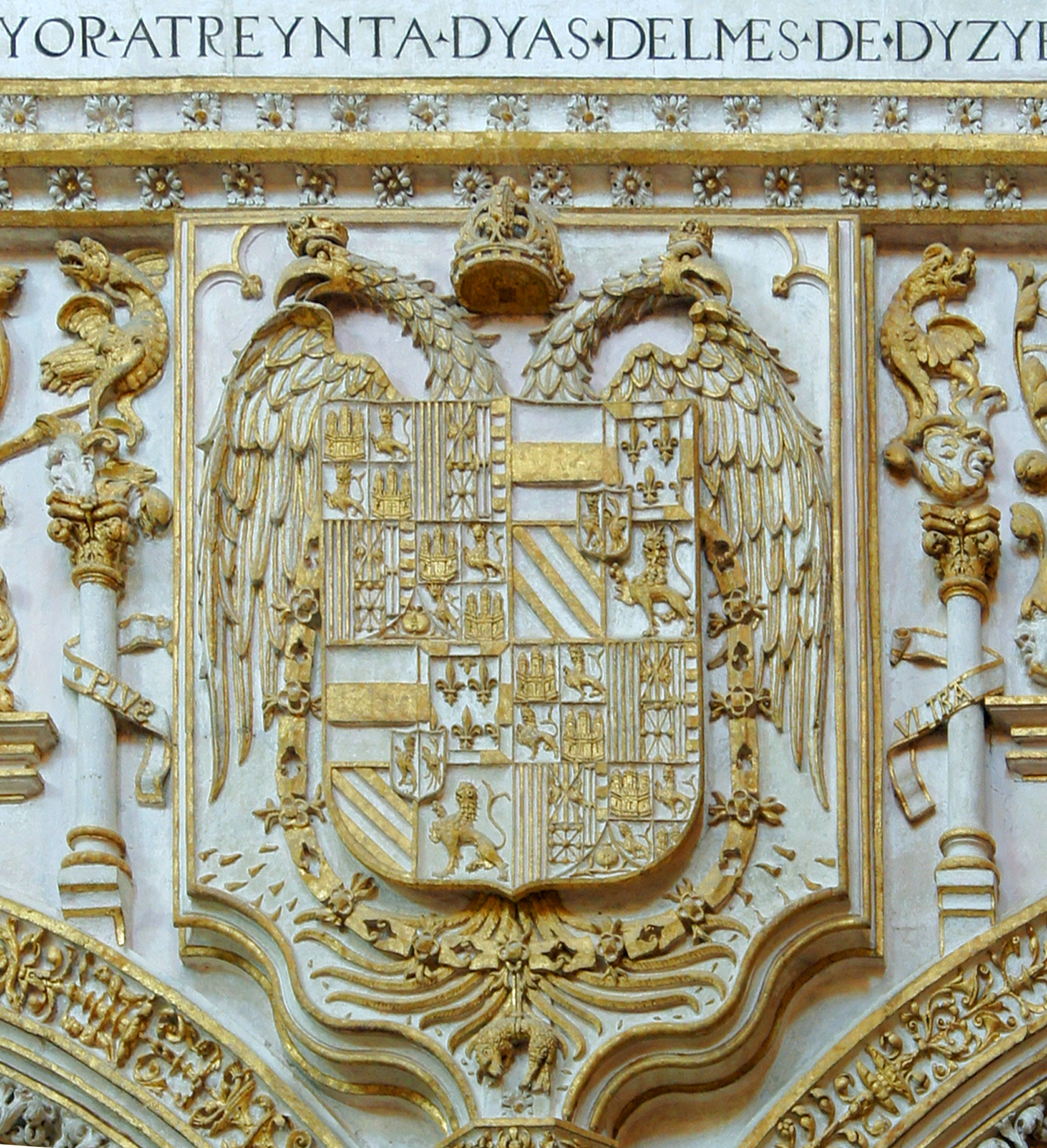
Arms of Charles V, Holy Roman Emperor in the choir of the Cathedral of Cordoba, 16th century.

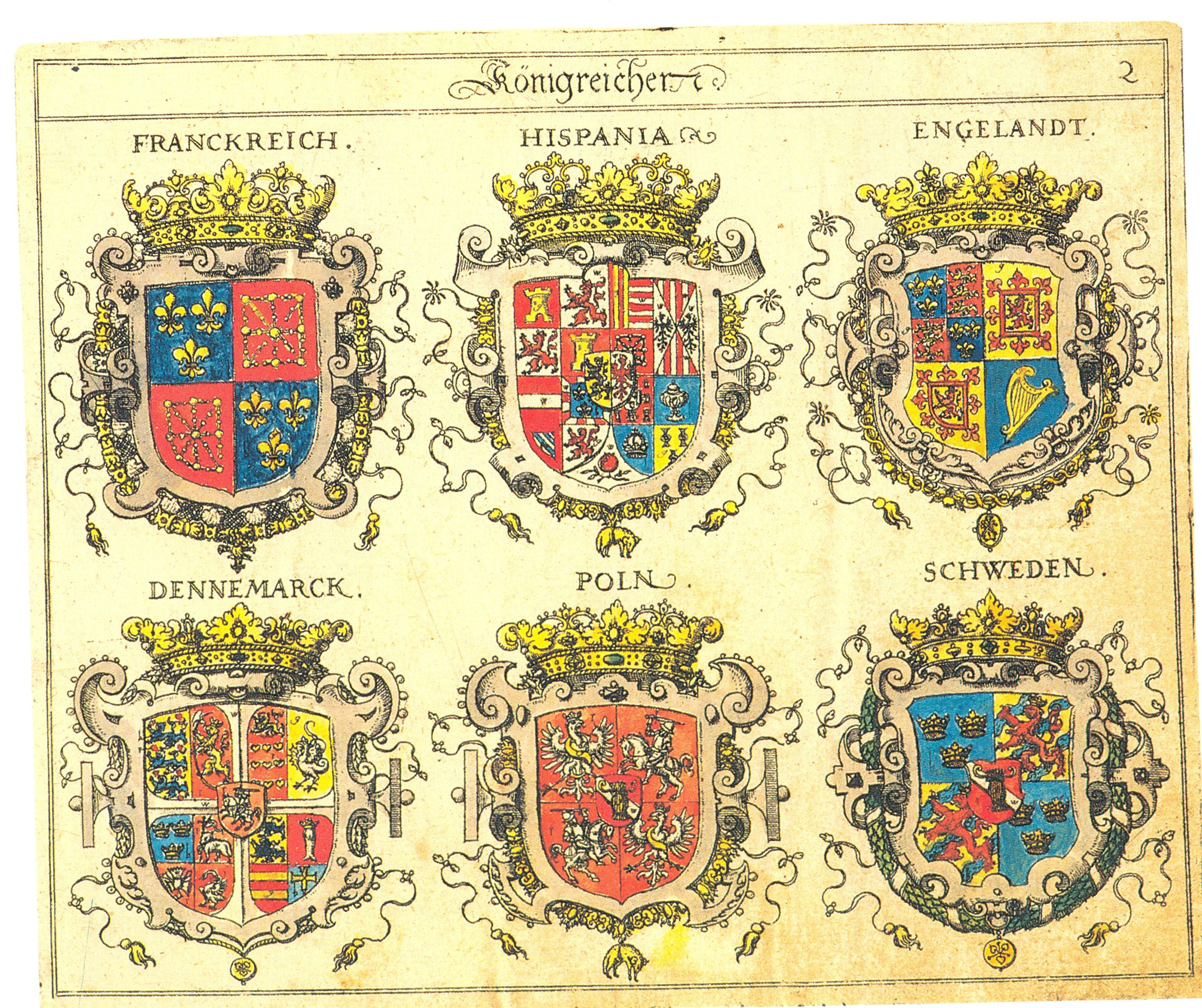
Royal coats of arms in Siebmachers Wappenbuch (1605)

In 1484, during the reign of Richard III, the various heralds employed by the crown were incorporated into the College of Arms, through which all new grants of arms would eventually be issued. The college currently consists of three Kings of Arms, assisted by six Heralds, and four Pursuivants, or junior officers of arms, all under the authority of the Earl Marshal; but all of the arms granted by the college are granted by the authority of the crown. Similar bodies regulate the granting of arms in other monarchies and several members of the Commonwealth of Nations, but in most other countries there is no heraldic authority, and no law preventing anyone from assuming whatever arms they please, provided that they do not infringe upon the arms of another.

Beginning in the reign of Henry VIII, the Kings of Arms were commanded to make visitations, in which they traveled about the country, recording arms borne under proper authority, and requiring those who bore arms without authority either to obtain authority for them, or cease their use. Arms borne improperly were to be taken down and defaced. The first such visitation began in 1530, and the last was carried out in 1700, although no new commissions to carry out visitations were made after the accession of William III in 1689.

During the early modern period, heraldry became highly complex and standardised, divided into "national" traditions. Western heraldry can be divided into three large cultural groups, "Gallo-British", "German-Nordic" and "Latin". Part of the Gallo-British group are French, English and Scottish traditions. The "German-Nordic" group includes the tradition of the Holy Roman Empire and its greater sphere of influence, including German heraldry, Swedish heraldry, Norwegian heraldry, Danish heraldry, Russian heraldry, Polish heraldry, Hungarian heraldry, Croatian heraldry, Serbian heraldry, etc.

The "Latin" group includes Italian heraldry, Spanish heraldry and Portuguese heraldry.

Dutch heraldry shows influence of all three groups.

Prominent burghers and corporations, including many cities and towns, assumed or obtained grants of arms, with only nominal military associations. Heraldic devices were depicted in various contexts, such as religious and funerary art, and in using a wide variety of media, including stonework, carved wood, enamel, stained glass, and embroidery.

With the abandonment of the joust as courtly practice at the beginning of the 17th century, heraldic achievements, especially the heraldry, ceased to be tied to the technological development or fashion of jousting armour and shapes of helmets became purely conventional, and in the various regional systems, separate types of helmets came to be tied to separate ranks of nobility.

Baroque heraldic designs became increasingly elaborate, both in terms of the increasingly complex division of the field and in terms of the surrounding achievements, culminating in the development of "landscape heraldry", incorporating realistic depictions of landscapes, during the latter part of the eighteenth and early part of the nineteenth century.

== Modern heraldry ==
In the mid-19th century, there was a renewed interest in the history of armory, but now mostly from an antiquarian's or genealogist's perspective. This led to a re-evaluation of older designs over Baroque and Roccoco styles, a new appreciation for the medieval origins of the art. Since the late nineteenth century, heraldry has focused on the use of varied lines of partition and little-used ordinaries to produce new and unique designs.

The term "heraldry" is sometimes used to include the national emblems of modern states. States with a republican tradition sometimes avoid coats of arms, instead using "national seals" or "national emblems" (such as the Emblem of Italy), using nonheraldic emblems in parallel to more heraldic arms (such as the diplomatic emblem of France), or by forgoing an official national emblem altogether (such as the case is with Turkey). National coats of arms are however popular among both constitutional monarchies (like Denmark and Spain) as well as republics (like Finland, Iceland, Portugal, the Gambia, Nigeria, Sierra Leone, Singapore, Chile, Guyana, Trinidad and Tobago, and the United States).

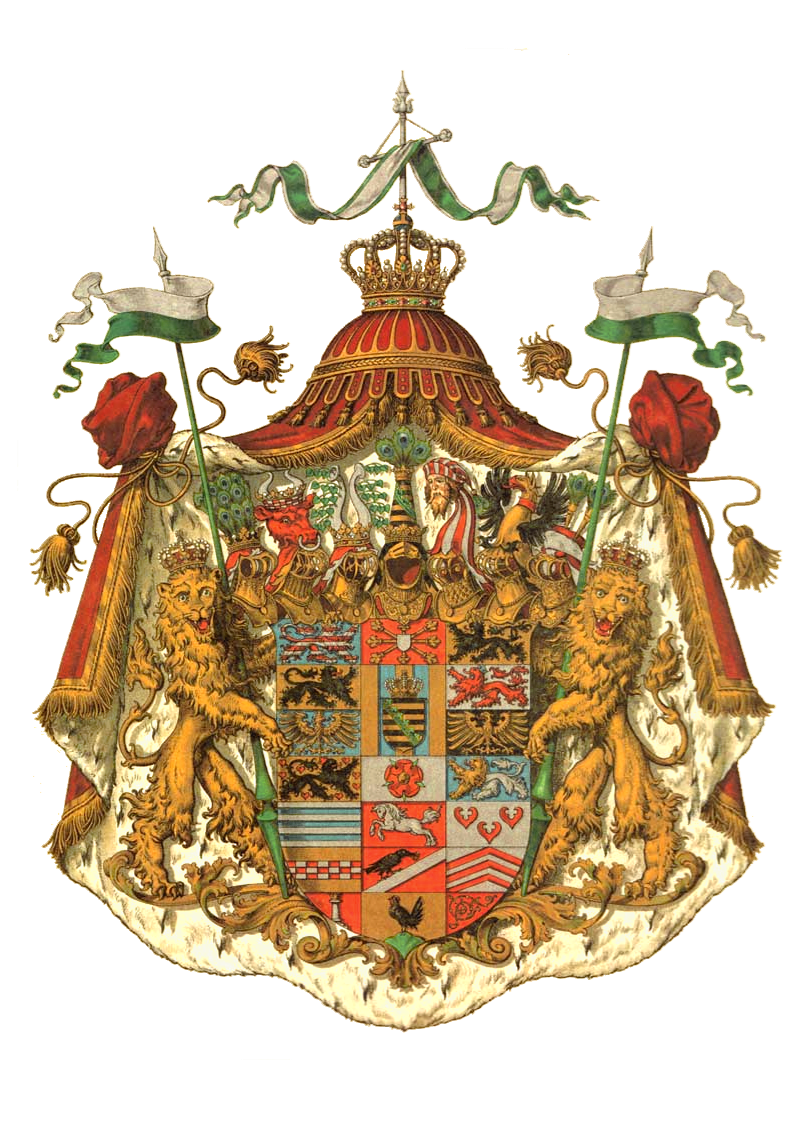
19th-century German heraldry has examples of shields with numerous crests, as this arms of Saxe-Altenburg featuring a total of seven crests. Some thaler coins display as many as fifteen.

Example of complex achievements in 19th-century Spanish heraldry: Coat of arms of Baldomero Espartero, Prince of Vergara (1793–1879).

Coat of arms of the Kingdom of Prussia (1873)

Coat of arms of the Mexican Empire (1864)

Coat of arms of Prince Harry, Duke of Sussex (b. 1984, granted in September 2002, on his 18th birthday)

Modern coat of arms of the Swiss canton of Graubünden, combined (marshalled) from the three older (15th to 16th century) coats of arms of the Three Leagues in 1932.

The coat of arms of the Czech Republic of 1992 was designed based on heraldic principles by heraldist Jiří Louda. It shows the Bohemian lion quartered with the Silesian and Moravian eagles.

== See also ==
- Ordinary of arms
- Military colours, standards and guidons
- Vexillology
- Naval heraldry
