= Charles E. Taylor =

Charles E. Taylor may refer to:

- Charlie Taylor (mechanic) (Charles Edward Taylor, 1868–1956), American inventor, mechanic and machinist
- Charles E. Taylor (engineer) (1924–2017), American engineer and professor
- Charlie Taylor (footballer, born 1884) (Charles Everate Taylor, 1884–1953), Australian rules footballer
- Charles E. Taylor (politician), member of the Montana State Senate

== See also ==
- Charles Taylor (disambiguation)
