= Charles A. Taylor =

Charles A. Taylor may refer to:

- Charles Taylor (physicist), British physicist
- Charles Asampong Taylor, Ghanaian footballer
- Chuck Taylor (American football), American football player, coach, and college athletics administrator
- Charles A. Taylor (Oklahoma politician)

== See also ==
- Charles Taylor (disambiguation)
