= Equestrian seal =

Type of seal in the European Middle Ages

An equestrian seal is a type of seal used in the European Middle Ages, characterized by the depiction of the owner as a mounted warrior in full armour. Originating in the high medieval period (late 11th to early 12th century), the type was frequently used throughout the 13th to 14th centuries. Continued use into the 15th and 16th centuries was mostly limited to high nobility, especially royalty, while lower nobility switched to the use of simple heraldic seals.

== Early examples (before 1170) ==
Early examples of equestrian seals are known from the second half of the 11th century. The oldest example that may be addressed as an "equestrian seal" is that of William I of England (c. 1067). Among the oldest extant examples in Germany is the seal of Henry of Laach (c. 1090). The horseman is characterized by the kite shield and a conical helmet, often bearing a banner. This type is continued into the mid-12th century, and late examples of kite shields are found into the 1160s.

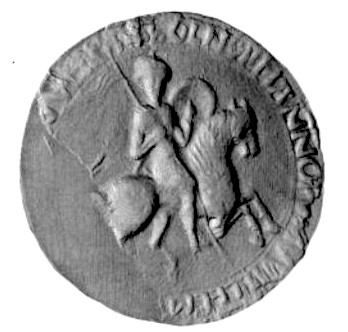
William I of England (c. 1067)

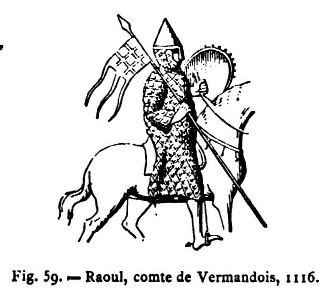
Ralph I, Count of Vermandois (1116)

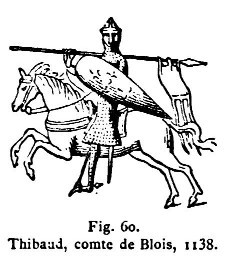
Thibaut de Blois (1138)

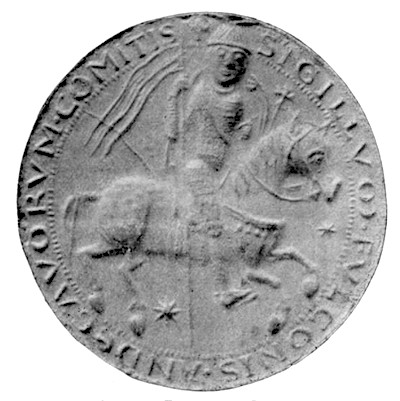
Fulk, King of Jerusalem (r. 1131–1143)

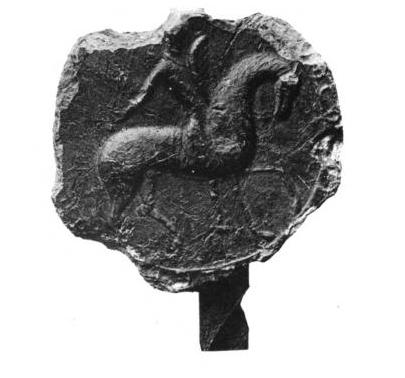
Gilbert de Clare (before 1148)

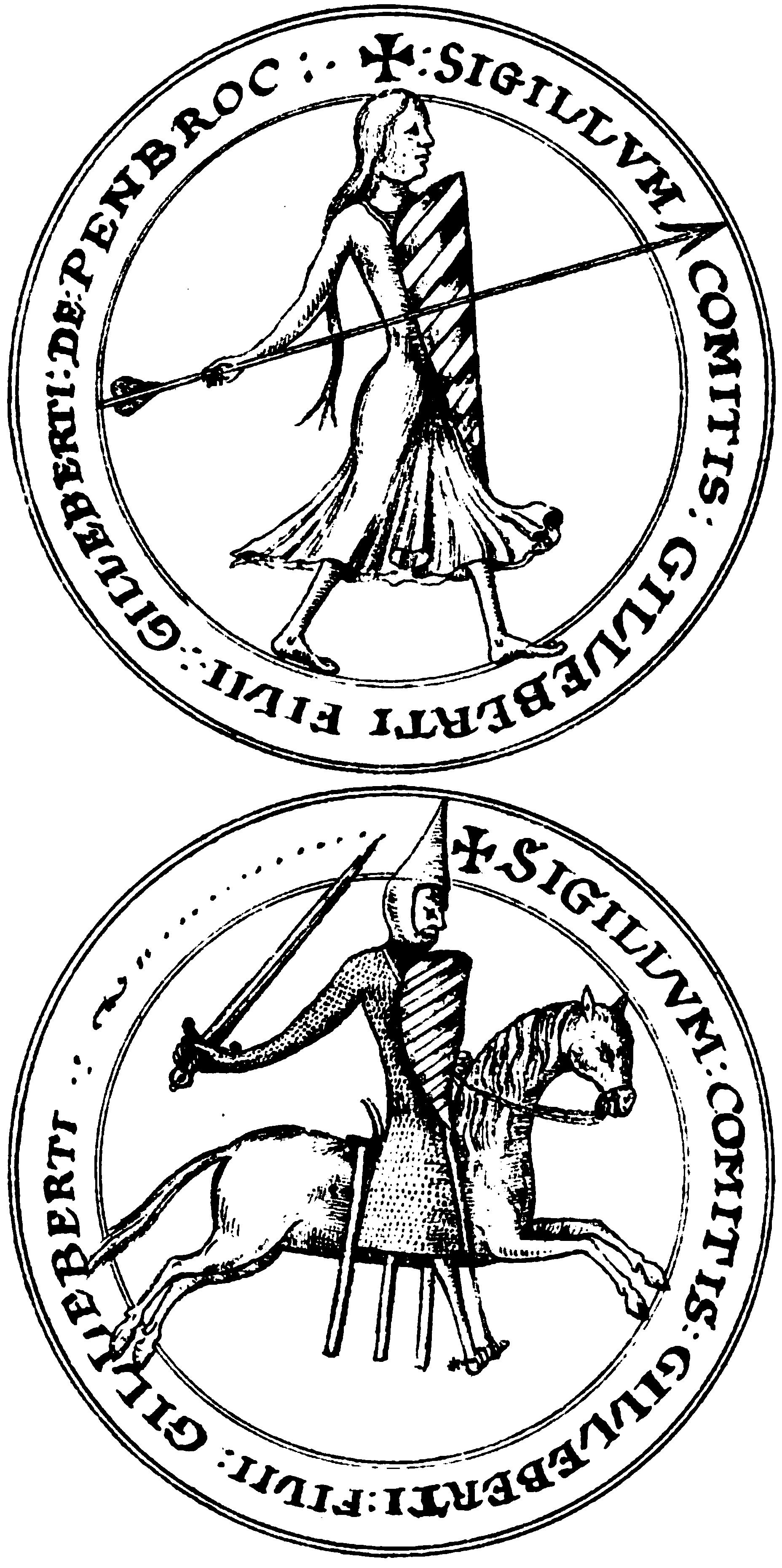
Gilbert de Clare, 1st Earl of Pembroke (d. 1148)

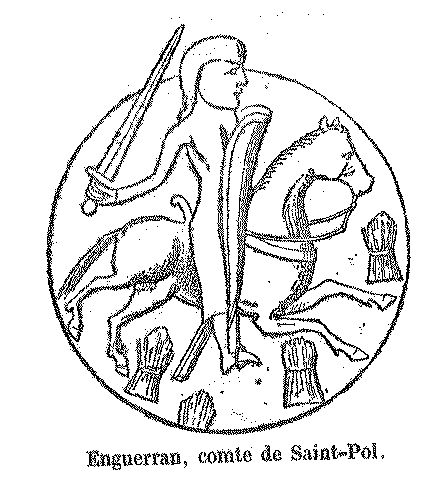
Enguerrand (Ingelram), count of Saint-Pol (before 1150)

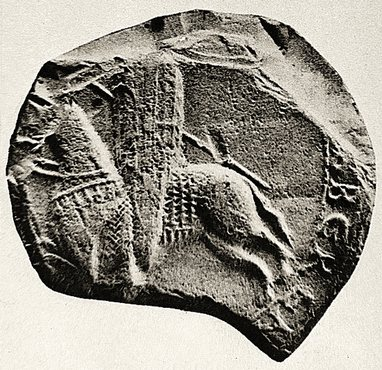
Ramon Berenguer IV of Barcelona (1150)

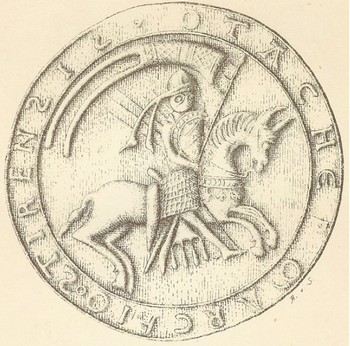
Ottokar III of Styria (1157)

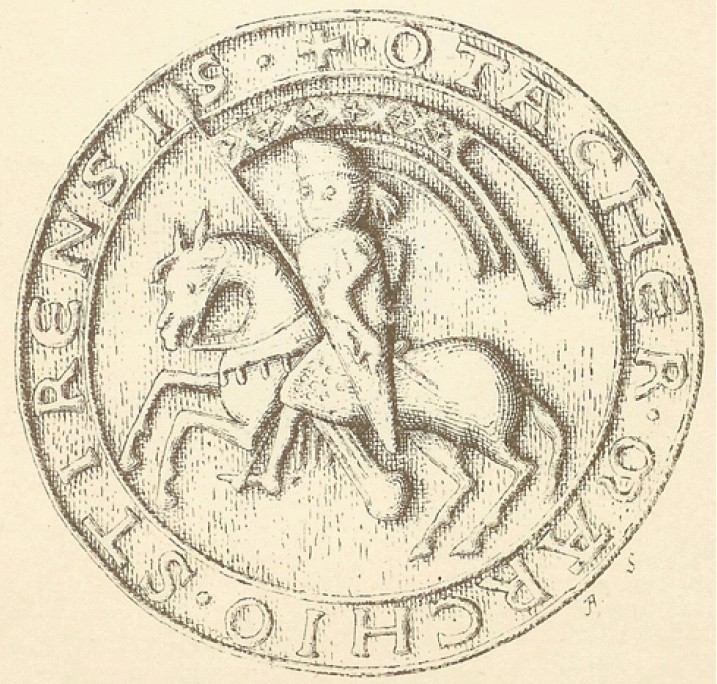
Ottokar III of Styria (1160)

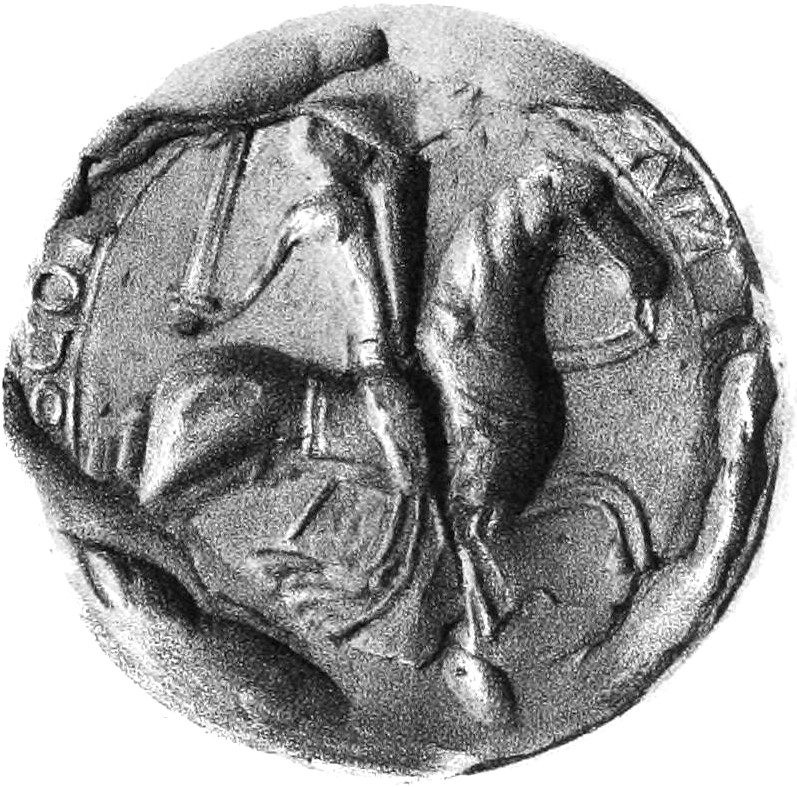
David, Earl of Huntingdon (1160)

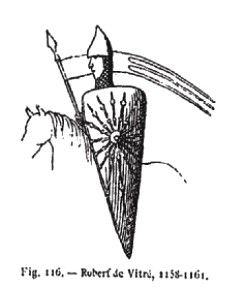
Robert III de Vitré (d. 1161)

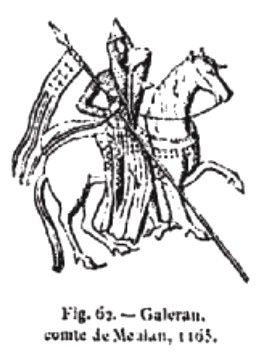
Galéran IV de Meulan (1165)

== High medieval seals (1170–1300) ==
The peak of usage comes with the development of the tradition of chivalry in the high medieval period, during c. the last quarter of the 12th century and throughout the 13th century. Seals of the 1170s to 1190s show shield shapes transitional between the "kite" and the "heater" type. Helmet shapes become less conical and more rounded. The horseman is now shown as the prototypical "knight" with a heraldic shield. From about the 1230s, the horse is increasingly shown as wearing a heraldic caparison, and the rider as wearing a great helm.

Around the middle of the 13th century, there was a fashion to also represent ladies and ecclesiastics on horseback on their seal, not wearing armour, but, as in the cases of Joan, Countess of Flanders (c. 1240), Maria of Brabant, Duchess of Bavaria (c. 1250) and Adelaide of Burgundy, Duchess of Brabant (c. 1260) practicing falconry.

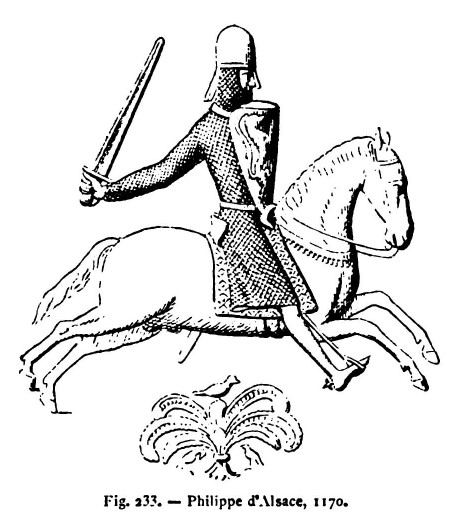
Philip I, Count of Flanders (1170)

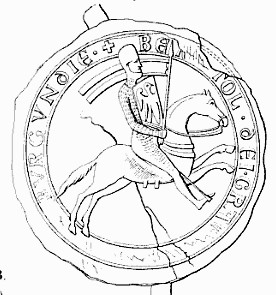
Berthold V, Duke of Zähringen (1187)

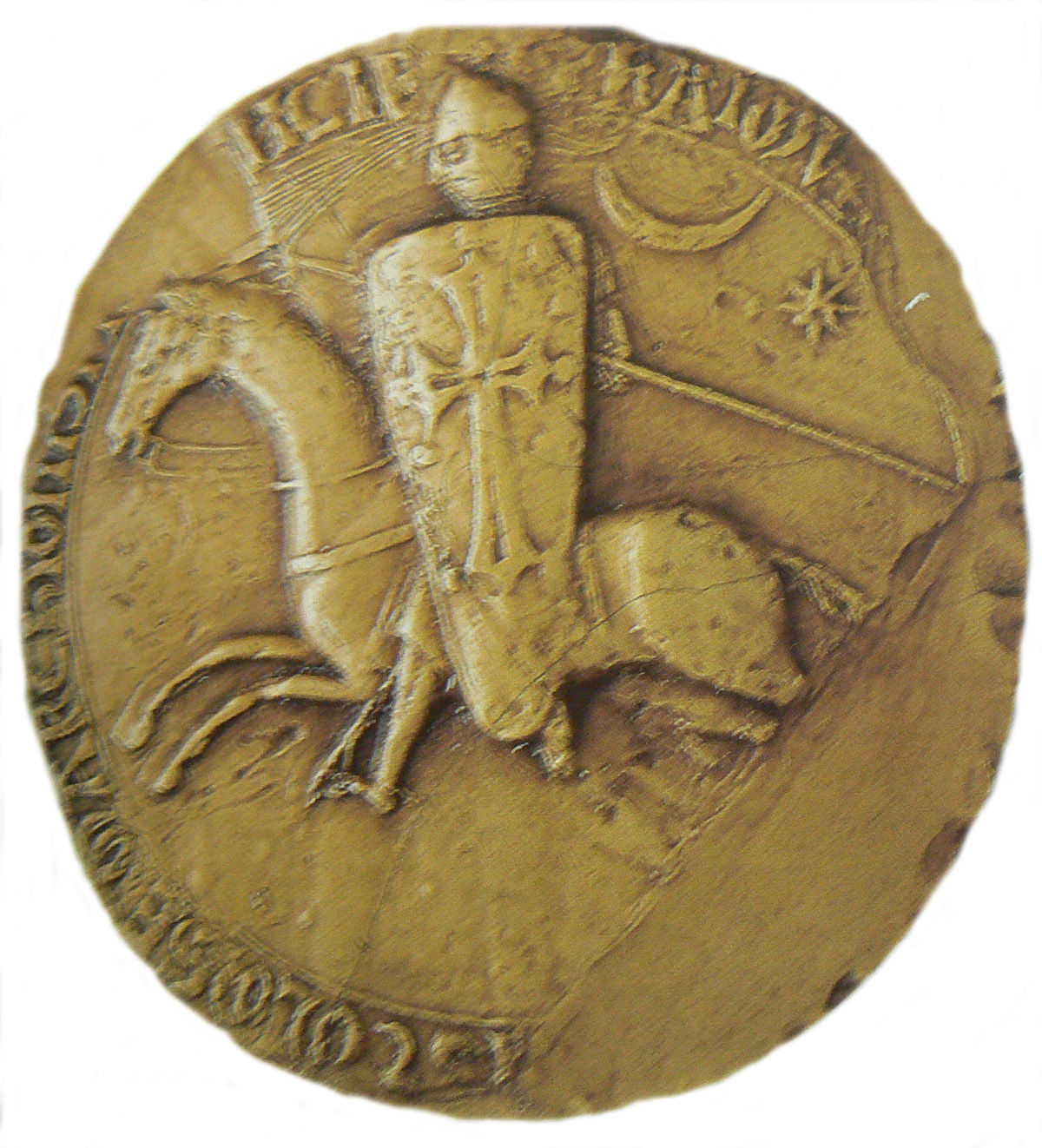
Raymond VI, Count of Toulouse (r. 1194-1222)

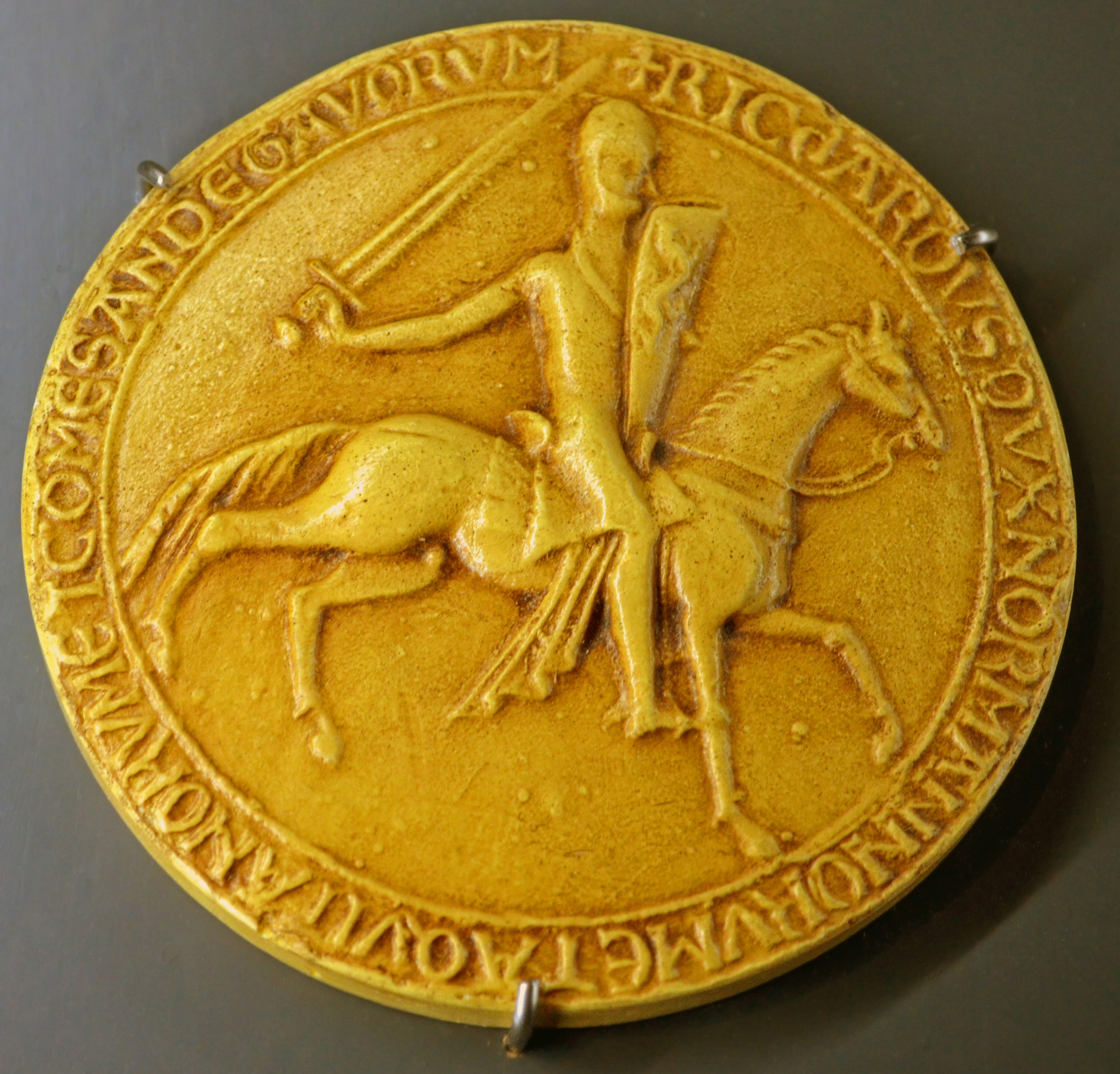
Richard I of England (1195)

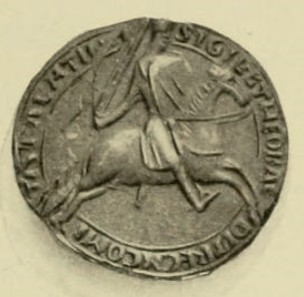
Theobald III, Count of Champagne (1198)

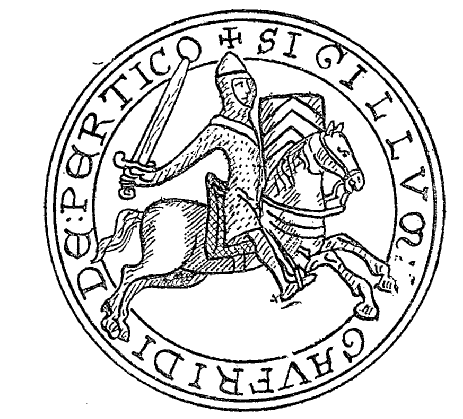
Geoffrey III, Count of Perche (d. 1202)

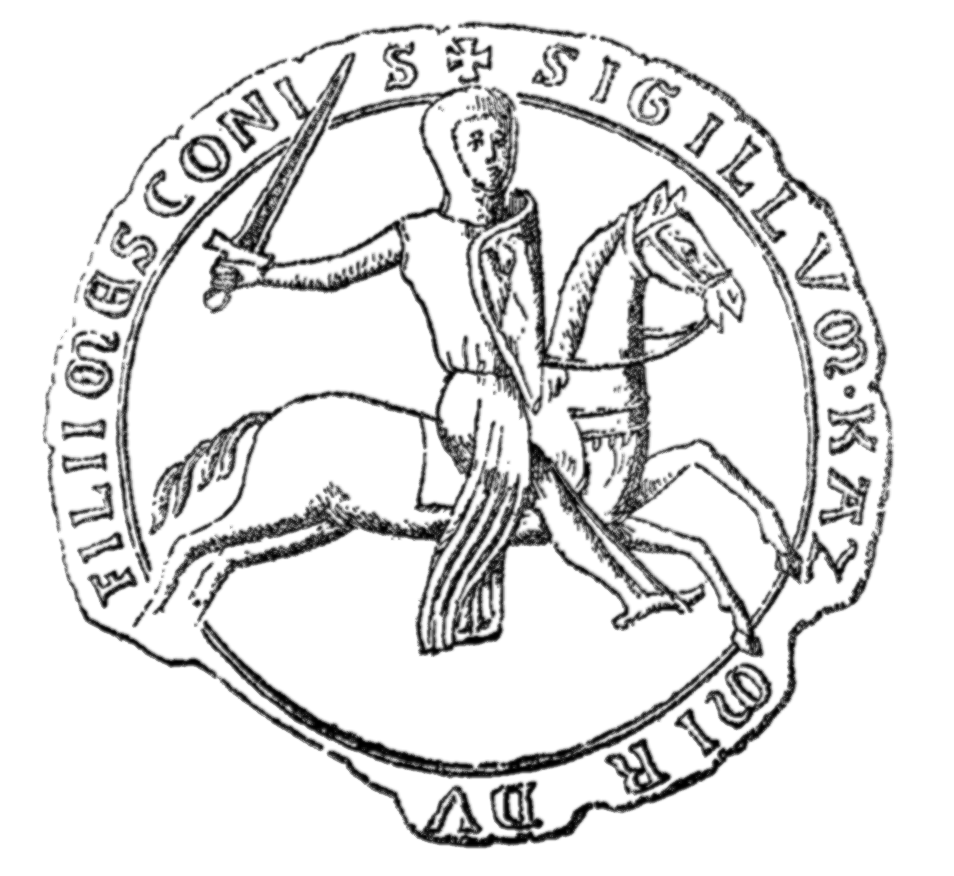
Casimir I of Opole (1226)

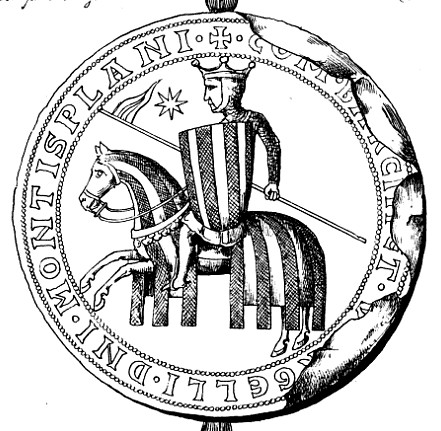
James I of Aragon (r. 1213–1276)

Matthew II of Montmorency (died 1230).

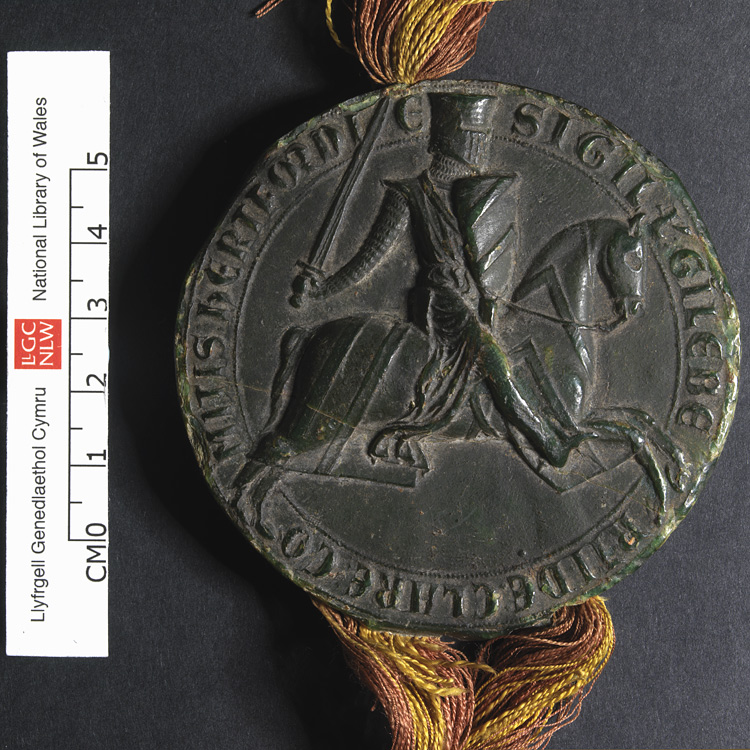
Gilbert de Clare, earl of Gloucester and Hertford, c. 1218–1230

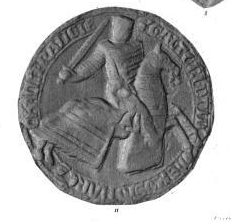
Gauthier III de Nemours (d. 1239)

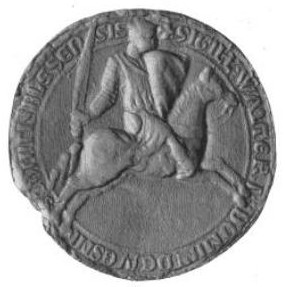
Walter II of Avesnes (d. 1244)

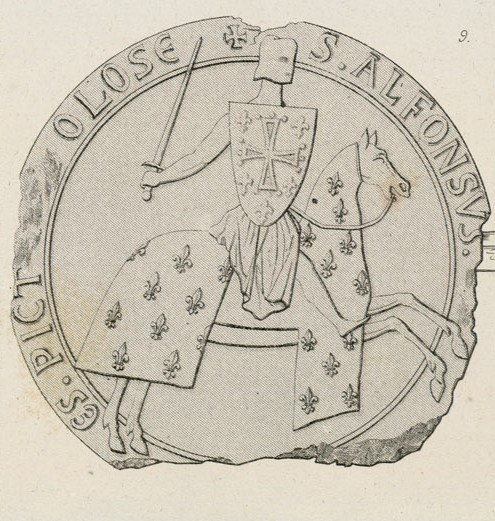
Alphonse, Count of Poitiers (d. 1271)

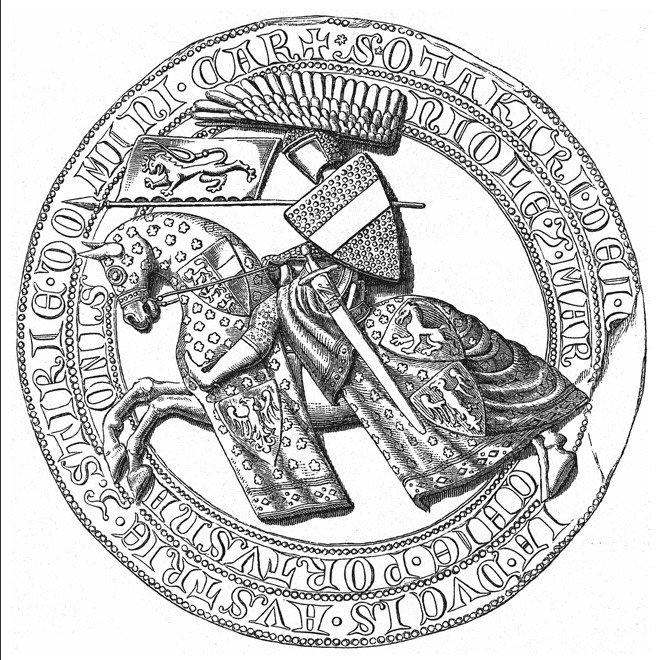
Ottokar II Premysl (1273)

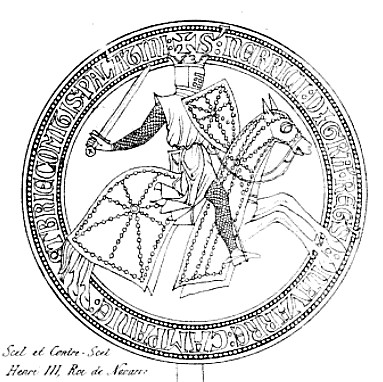
Henry I of Navarre (r. 1270–1274)

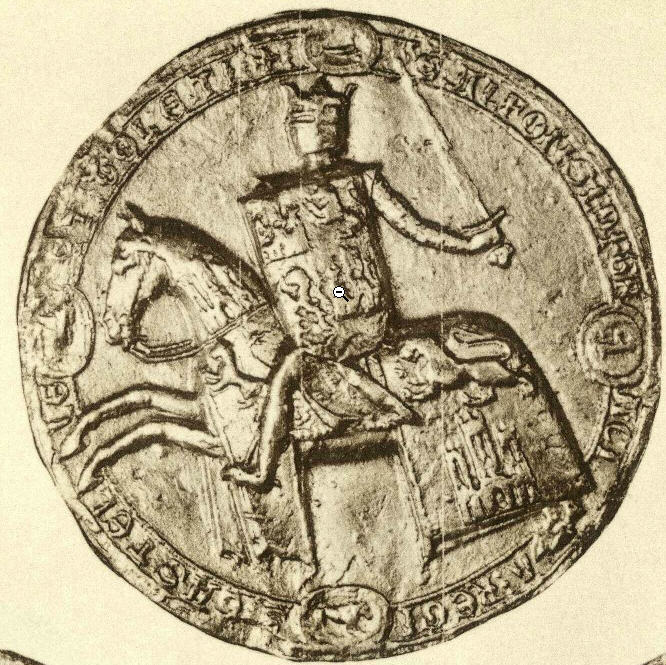
Alfonso X of Castile (d. 1284)

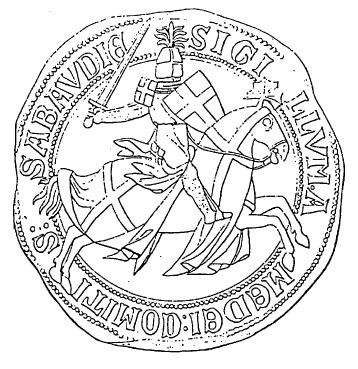
Amadeus V, Count of Savoy (c. 1285)

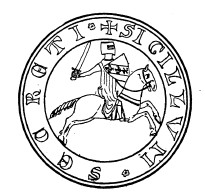
Frederick III, Duke of Lorraine (1286)

== Late medieval seals (1300–1550) ==
After 1300, equestrian seals were almost exclusively used by the high nobility, by bearers of the rank of duke or higher. Representations in seals of the 14th century show the nobleman with full heraldic achievements, often carrying a heraldic flag, or with a lance in full jousting armour.

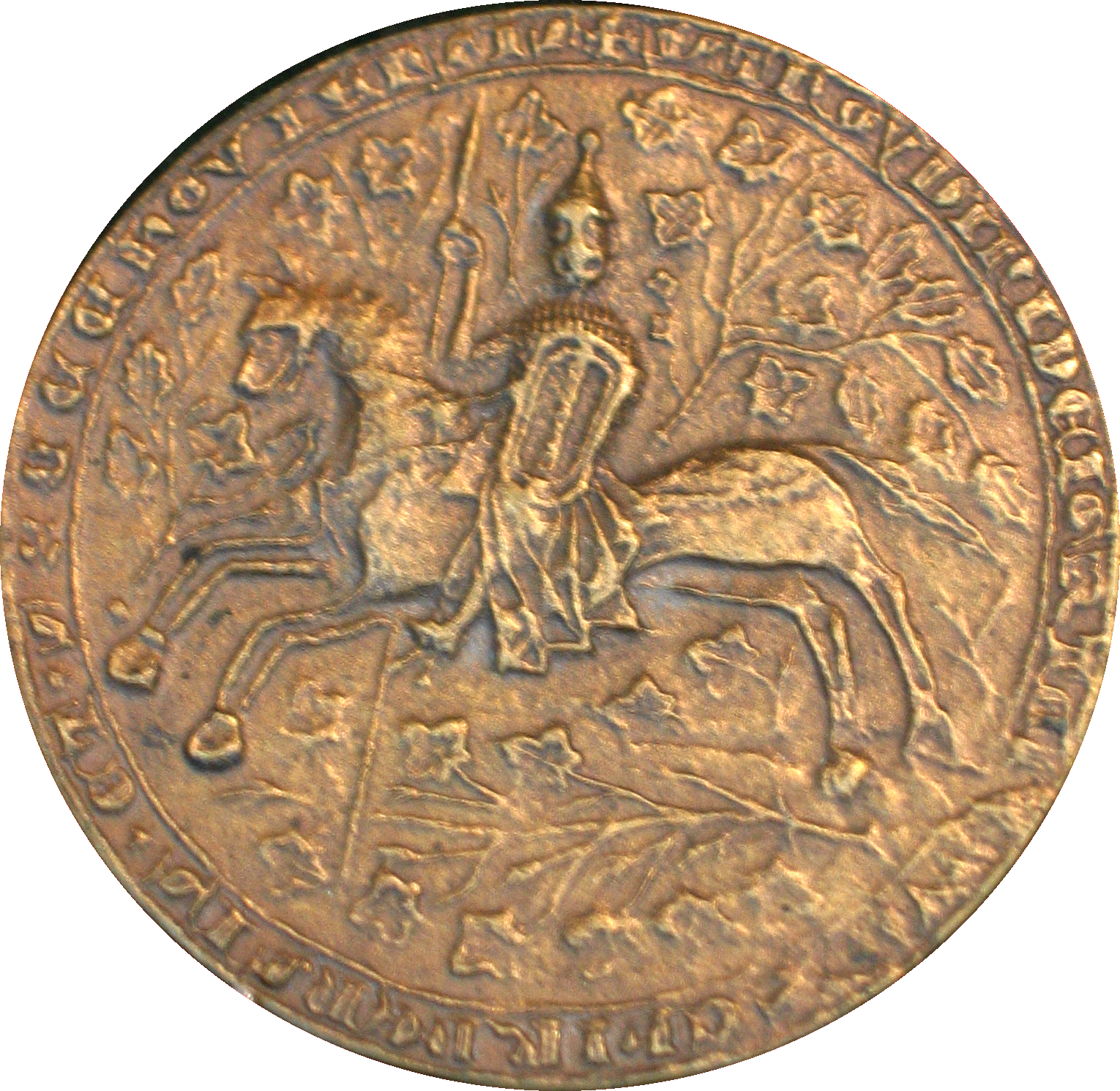
Trojden I, Duke of Masovia (1341)

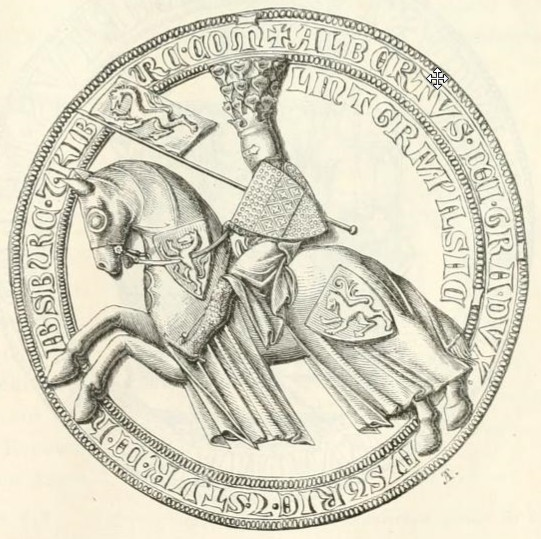
Albert I of Habsburg (d. 1308)

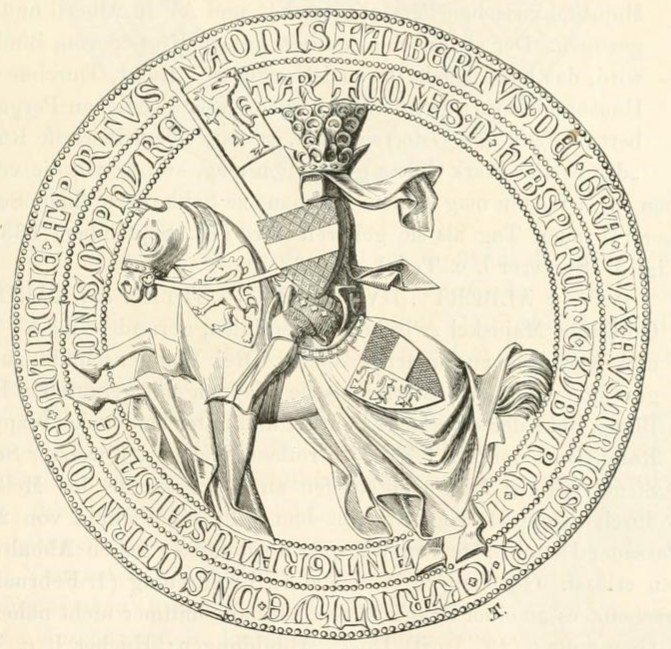
Albert II, Duke of Austria (d. 1358)

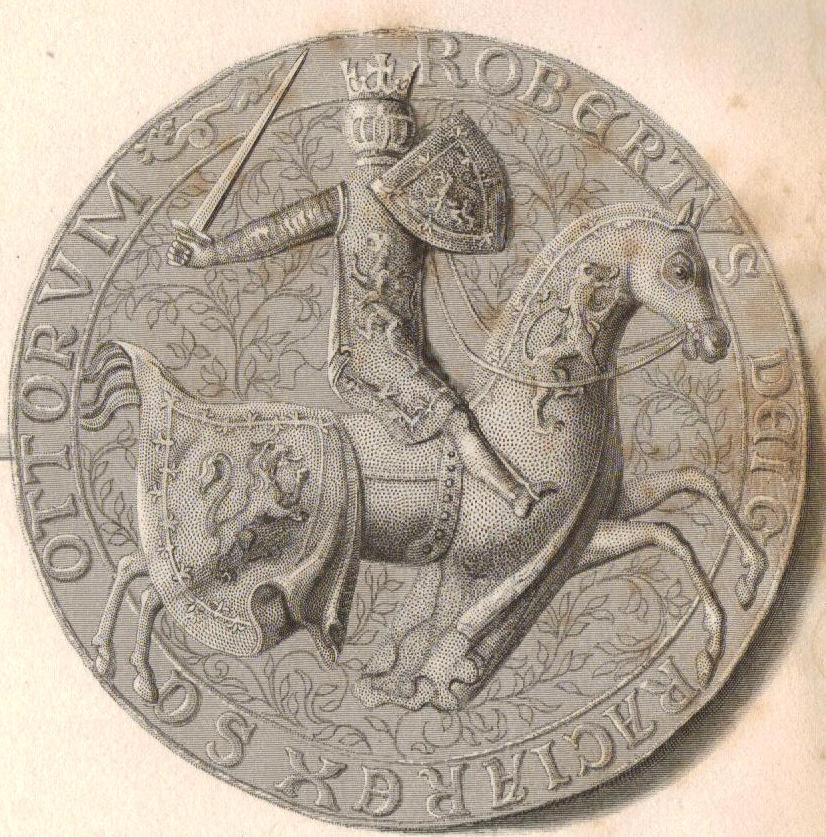
Robert II of Scotland (r. 1371–1390)

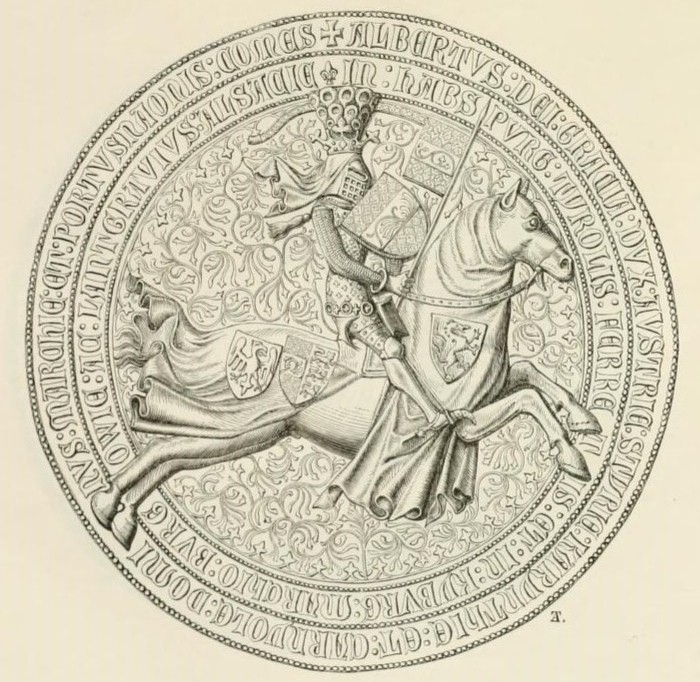
Albert III, Duke of Austria (d. 1395)

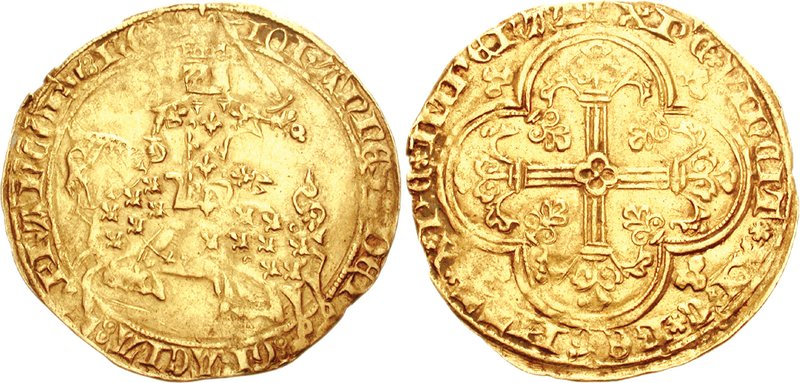
The so-called franc-à-cheval was a gold coin valued one livre tournois minted from 1360. The obverse shows the French king in the style of an equestrian seal. This coin is the origin of the name franc for the French currency.

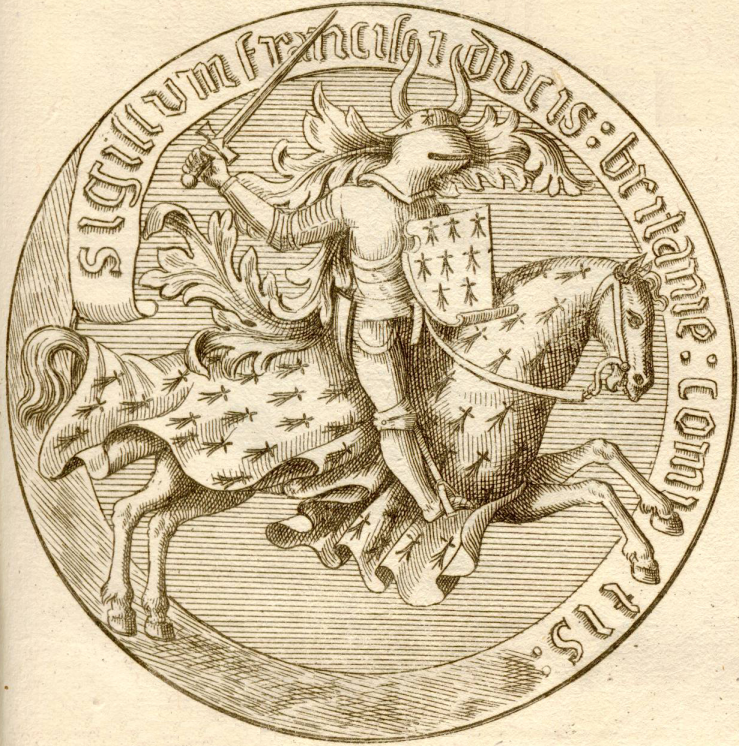
Francis II, Duke of Brittany (r.1458–1488)

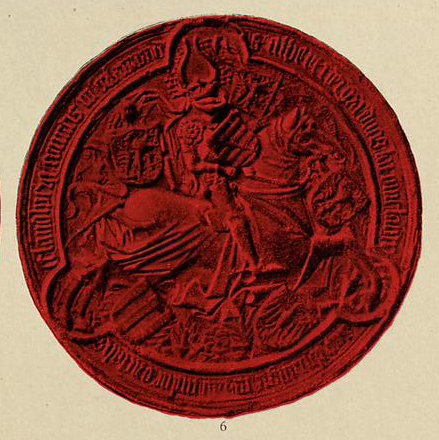
Albert III, Duke of Saxony (d. 1500)

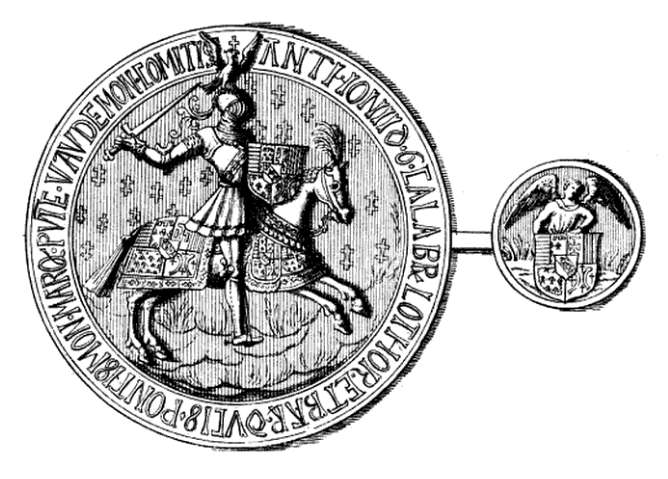
Antoine, Duke of Lorraine (1508)

== Late forms (after 1550) ==
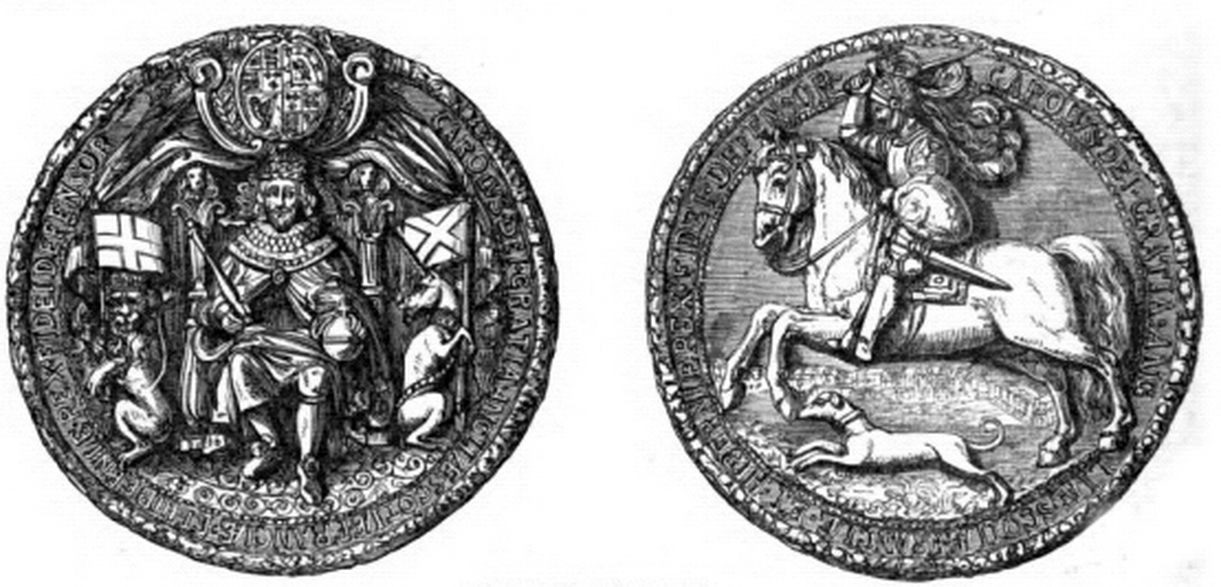
Great Seal of Charles I of England (1627)

Late forms were used well into the early modern period in France and Germany. Depictions of monarchs in full armour, crested helmets, with lances or heraldic flags etc. fell out of use with the end of the joust in the early 17th century. Frederick the Great of Prussia used a Majestätssiegel which depicted him on horseback in 1772 (albeit no longer depicted as a fully armored knight but as a military commander).

The reverse of the Great Seal of Charles I of England (1627) shows the monarch in full gallop, wearing a fanciful classicist armour, accompanied by a hunting dog. The British monarchs from 1707 onward continued the convention of depicting the seated and crowned monarch on the obverse, and the monarch on horseback on the reverse. This is the case also for the queen regnants (Great Seal of Queen Anne, Queen Victoria, Elizabeth II), who are depicted in sidesaddle.

In 1976, Austria minted a commemorative gold coin (13.5g 90% Au) on the occasion of the millennial anniversary of the Babenberg dynasty (Leopold I, Margrave of Austria), known as the Babenberger-Bundesgoldmünze. The obverse of this coin was designed in the style of a medieval equestrian seal (with the addition of an alpine panorama).

== Modern heraldic forms ==
In heraldic art, influenced by the equestrian seals, horsemen are a fairly common symbol. Two widely popular forms that the horseman takes is as the Pahonia and Saint George fighting the dragon. While these symbols are used in various coats of arms, they are arguably most famous as the Coat of arms of Lithuania and the Coat of arms of Moscow respectively.

Modern coat of arms of Lithuania

Modern alternative national emblem of Belarus

Saint George on horseback on the coat of arms of Moscow

Saint George on horseback on the coat of arms of Russia

== See also ==
- History of heraldry
- Pahonia
