= Charles Vincent Taylor =

American biologist

Charles Vincent Taylor (8 February 1885 – 22 February 1946) was an American biologist and a professor at Stanford University. He contributed to studies on protozoa, innovating micro-manipulation and dissection techniques for their study.

Taylor was born near Whitesville, Missouri, to Christina Bashor and Isaac Newton Taylor. On his father's side they traced their ancestry to an Isaac Taylor from County Antrim, Ireland who came to Virginia around 1740. His mother came from a family of German descent. He studied at Mount Morris College, Illinois and after receiving an AB in 1911 he became a principal of a school at Valley City, North Dakota. He joined the University of California, Berkeley in 1914 and studied mouse reproduction in 1914 under Joseph A. Long and then studied the neuromotor structure of the ciliate Euplotes using microscopic dissection studies under the supervision of Charles A. Kofoid in 1917. He then became an instructor at the zoology before joining Johns Hopkins University. He worked at the Marine Biological Laboratory with Robert Chambers on micromanipulation techniques using glass micropipettes. He joined Stanford University in 1925. His work included studies of protoplasm movements, cyst formation in ciliates and ciliate taxonomy and evolution. At Stanford, he emphasized, as an administrator of the biology faculty, a broad understanding in biology for students in addition to their specialities. In 1939, he organized a symposium to celebrate the hundredth anniversary of Schleiden and Schwann's cell theory.

Taylor married Lola Lucille Felder, a student of his, in 1921 and they had four children.
