= Charles Chatworthy Wood Taylor =

British artist (1792–1856)

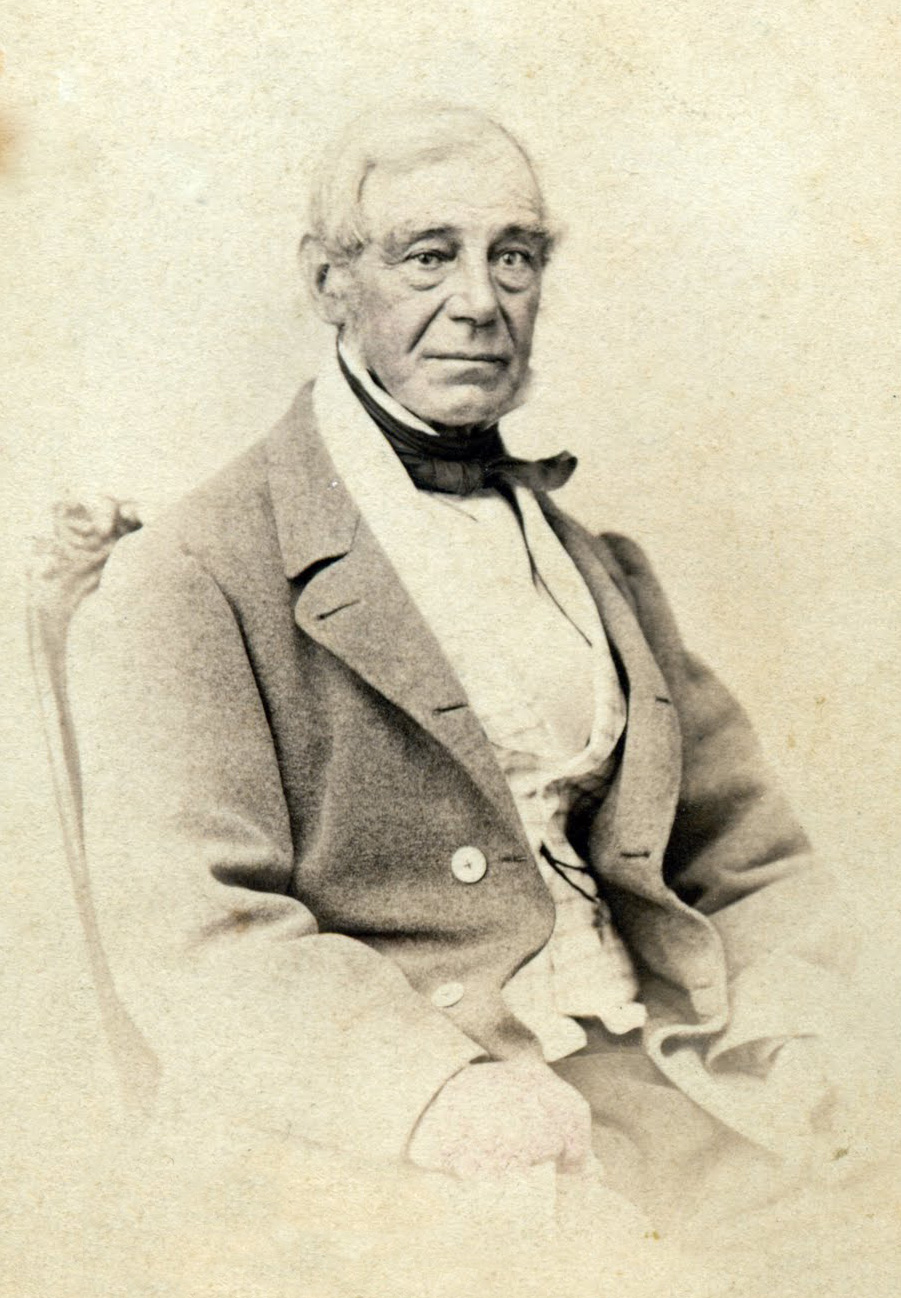
- Portrait of Charles C. Wood Taylor
- Born: Charles Chatworthy Wood Taylor; 25 April 1792; Liverpool, England
- Died: 19 February 1856 (aged 63); London, England
- Occupations: Painter, engineer, mariner, and military officer
- Known for: Designing the coat of arms of Chile
- Notable work: Wreck of the Arethusa (painting)

Charles Chatworthy Wood Taylor, known in Chile as Carlos Wood (25 April 1792 – 19 February 1856), was a British painter, engineer, mariner, and military officer.

He designed the coat of arms of Chile, which was adopted by the government in 1834, incorporating the huemul and the condor.

== Biography ==
He was born on 25 April 1792, son of the Irish John Chatworthy Wood and Susan Taylor.

He emigrated to the United States in 1817 and worked as a landscape painter in Boston, moving his family a year later.

In 1819 he was hired by the U.S. government to embark on a scientific expedition on the frigate Macedonia to Mexico, Ecuador, Peru, and Chile.

In August 1820 he returned to Chile and became a lieutenant (and later captain) in the Chilean army's engineering corps.

He married Dolores Chacon Ramirez de Arellano.

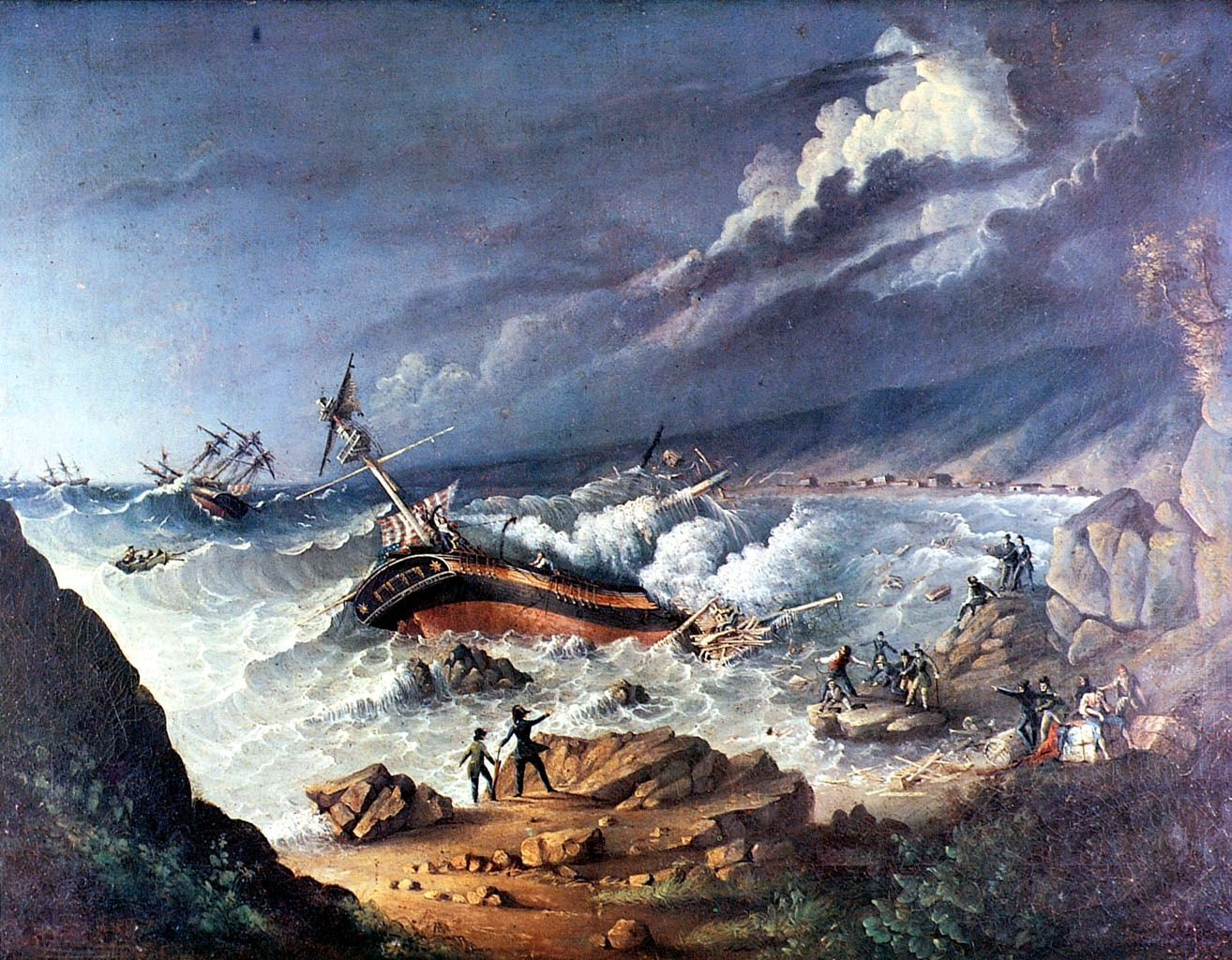
Wreck of the Arethusa (El naufragio del Arethusa) by Taylor, 1826

Taylor designed the coat of arms of Chile, adopted by the government in 1834, incorporating the huemul and the condor.

== Professional life ==
In 1830, he was appointed professor of drawing the National Institute. He then moved to Valparaiso, where in 1833 he made plans for the quartermaster of this port, designed the customs clock tower and the railway line to Cerro Alegre, and in 1837, drew the topographic map of the city. He was appointed inspector of public works of the city, planning the Huth House and Port San Antonio.

In 1842, he raised the level of customs buildings in Talcahuano, then the ports of Coquimbo, Copiapo and Caldera. In 1845 he traced the route of the railroad from Caldera to Copiapo, built by William Wheelwright. For his connection with England, he was appointed English naval inspector in Valparaiso.

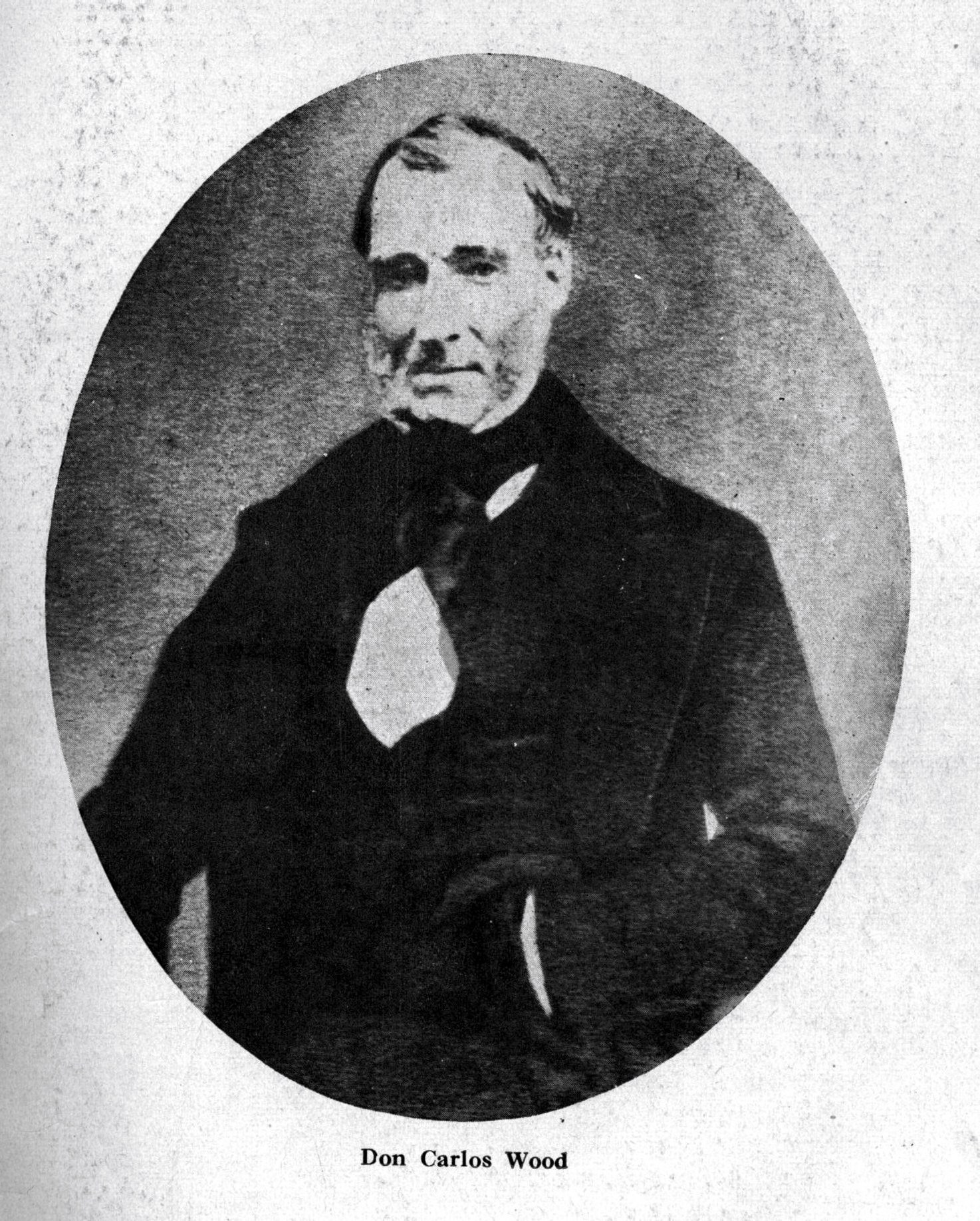
Portrait of Taylor

In 1855, he traveled to Europe, as he was suffering from heart disease. He visited Chilean friends living in France, Belgium, and London, England. His health worsened, and he died on 19 February 1856 in London. He was buried in Kensal Green Cemetery.
