= Charles Taylor (MP for Totnes) =

English barrister and politician

Charles Taylor FRS (c. 1693 – 1766), of Maridge, near Totnes, Devon, was an English barrister and politician.

He was the eldest son of attorney Charles Taylor of Ugborough and Totnes, Devon, and educated at Wadham College, Oxford. He entered the Middle Temple in 1710 to study law and was called to the bar in 1717, becoming a bencher in 1749.

He was appointed a deputy remembrancer in the Court of Exchequer from 1729 to his death and was deputy recorder of Totnes from 1728 to 1736. He was elected a Fellow of the Royal Society in 1722.

He was a Member of the Parliament of Great Britain for Totnes from 1747 to 1754.

He died in 1766. He had married Ann Pearse in 1725 and had four sons.
