= Coat of arms of Chile =

- Armiger: Republic of Chile
- Adopted: 26 June 1834 (original version); 12 December 1967 (current design)
- Crest: Three feathers Azure, Argent, Gules
- Torse: Azure, Argent and Gules
- Shield: Party per fess Azure and Gules a mullet argent
- Supporters: Dexter, a huemul proper; Sinister, an Andean condor also proper, both navally crowned Or
- Compartment: A vegetal compartment Or on the bottom, white scroll with motto on it
- Motto: Por la razón o la fuerza "By reason or by force"
- Designer: Charles Wood Taylor

The coat of arms of Chile dates from 1834 and was designed by the English artist Charles Wood Taylor (1792–1856). It is made up by a figurative background divided in two equal parts: the top one is blue and the bottom, red. A five pointed white star is in the centre of the shield. This background is supported in one side by an Andean condor, the most significant bird of prey from the Andes, and in the other, by a huemul, a mammal endemic to Chile. Both animals wear golden naval crowns symbolising the heroic deeds of the Chilean Navy in the Pacific Ocean.

The coat of arms is crowned by a three-feathered crest, each feather bearing one colour: blue, white and red. This crest was a symbol of distinction that former presidents of the Republic used to wear on their hats.

Underneath the coat of arms and on the elaborated pedestal, there is a white band with the motto: Por la Razón o la Fuerza ("By reason or force").

This emblem is the last of a series of variations due to diverse circumstances and understandings.

== Official description ==
Under Decreto Supremo Nº 1534 del Ministerio del Interior de Chile, sobre el uso de los Emblemas Nacionales, Chilean law describes the coat of arms as follows:

The Coat of Arms presents a five-pointed silver star in the center of a cut field, turquoise blue the top and red the bottom and its shape is that fixed by the official model approved by War Decree No. 2,271 of September 4, 1920, in accordance with the law, and which, in addition, has a timbre a tricolor plumage of turquoise blue, white and red; for supports a rampant huemulum on its right and a condor on its left in the position that fixes that model, crowned each of these animals with a gold naval crown; and on the base an arcocola crossed by a ribbon with the slogan "by reason or strength", all in accordance with the aforementioned model.

== History ==
=== The first coat of arms ===
First coat of arms; representation with the human figures as supporters.

The first coat of arms was created during the office of President José Miguel Carrera, in 1812. It was designed over an oval in which center was depicted a column representing the Tree of Freedom. On top of this column was a terrestrial globe; over the globe, a lance and a palm leaf crossed and over these two, a star.

Standing, on both sides of the fixture, was the figure of an indigenous woman and a man. On top of everything was written, in Latin, Post Tenebras Lux ("After the Darkness, Light") and at the bottom, Aut Consilio Aut Ense ("By Council or by Sword").

This emblem, like the first Chilean flag, was initially exclusively for army use. In Chile, the Spanish emblems were still used at the time of the Chilean War of Independence. When the Spanish army arrived in Chile in 1813, with the goal of reconquering the country, the first independent emblems were adopted as national symbols.

There are no original representations of this first coat of arms, so its design is open to interpretation. One of the few sources is a description made in the Memoria histórica sobre la Revolución de Chile by Melchor Martínez. Although the version with supporters is the most accepted representation of the coat, other historians have suggested that the coat of arms was oval-shaped, and had also a reverse depicting a sun rising behind mountain with the mottoes Aurora libertatis chilensis ("The beginning of Chilean liberty") and Umbra et nocti, lux et libertas succedunt ("Shadow and night are succeeded by light and liberty").

In 1817, two new coats of arms emerged. The first one, created in June, showed a similar pillar and globe, and the motto Libertad ("Liberty") over them, together with the words Unión y fuerza ("Union and strength") on a black blue field.

=== Transitory coat of arms ===
Second coat of arms.

Two years later, on 23 September 1819, a new project for a coat of arms was approved in the Senate. It was a dark blue field, with a column standing on a white marble pedestal in the middle. On top of this column, the new American world with the word "Libertad" (Liberty) over it. Above this sign, a five-pointed star, representing the province of Santiago. Two similar stars, representing Concepción and Coquimbo, were at each side of the column.

This combination of elements was surrounded by two small branches of laurel with their buds tied with a tricolor ribbon. Around this ribbon, the whole armory of the country was depicted in strict order: cavalry, infantry, dragoons, artillery and bombardiers.

To complete the coat of arms, an indigenous man held it with his hands over his head, while sitting on an American cayman with one foot resting on the Horn of Plenty. The cayman had, in its jaws, the Lion of Castile, whose crown laid fallen on one side and was holding the ripped Spanish flag with its front paws.

This coat of arms was used until 1834, when it was replaced with another one very similar to the current one.

=== The current coat of arms ===
In 1832, Joaquín Prieto commissioned the creation of a permanent coat of arms for the Republic. Charles Chatworthy Wood Taylor, an English artist, was designer of the coat that included a field party per fess, blue and red, with a condor and a huemul for supporters and three feathers with the national colors of Chile, that symbolized the feathers that the President and Supreme Director used on their hats as a symbol of power.

In 1920, the motto Por la razón o la fuerza was added to the coat of arms.

== Evolution ==
=== As part of the Spanish Empire ===
Evolution of the coats of arms used in Chile (1540—1813 and 1814–1817)
In 1540, Chile became part of the Spanish Empire
Coat of arms	Dates	Details	Shield
	1540—1556	Prior to its independence, as part of the Spanish Empire, in the Captaincy General of Chile the coats of arms of Spain were used. Although initially their use was only nominal, by 1750 the coat of arms of the Spanish monarch appeared on every coin coined in Chile. In the golden coins (Escudos), from 1749 to 1763, the greater arms of Phillip V were shown; and from 1763 to 1817, when Chile became independent, Charles III and Ferdinand VII used another version that included Parma and Tuscany. The Spanish emblem was no longer used during the final years of the Patria Vieja.	
	1556—1558		
	1558—1580		
	1580—1668		
	1668—1700		
	1700—1763		
	1763—1813; 1814—1817		
	1751—1770	In the silver coins (Reales), a lesser version, including only the quarterly of Castile and León, the Grenade Entée-en-point, and the Anjou escutcheon, was shown (from 1773, it included also the Pillars of Hercules). Also, from 1751 to 1770 the currency badge of the Spanish West Indies was used.	
	1751—1813; 1814—1817	In the silver coins (Reales), a lesser version, including only the quarterly of Castile and León, the Grenade Entée-en-point, and the Anjou escutcheon, was shown (from 1773, it included also the Pillars of Hercules). Also, from 1751 to 1770 the currency badge of the Spanish West Indies was used.	

=== As an independent nation ===
Evolution of the coats of arms used in Chile (1813—1814 and 1817–)
In 1817, Chile became an independent nation
Coat of arms	Dates	Details	Shield
	1813—1814	The first arms depicted a doric column with a globe at its top, with a native man and woman as supporters, a wreath, a halbert, a star and the two mottoes in Latin Post tenebras lux and Aut consilio aut ense.	
	1817—1819	During this time, two coats of arms showing a column similar to the one in the previous shield were used. The both of them had a reverse identical as the one depicted in the flag that was used to declare Chilean Independence, that showed a volcano erupting and the motto Chile Independ[ien]te.	
	1819—1834	This coat was approved by the Senate in 1819, and was extremely similar to the two previous ones. It depicted a column and a globe, as the 1813 shield, and had three stars representing the provinces of Santiago, Coquimbo and Concepción. The ornamented coat of arms was represented on the Cerro Castillo Presidential Palace.	
	1834—1920	This coat was designed by Charles Wood, an English artist, commissioned by the government of Joaquín Prieto in 1832. In his design, it didn't conserve any of the elements of any of the previous shields. The variant with a mount vert in compartment displays the Copihue, the national flower. The ornamented variation displays eight Chilean national flags on lances behind the supporters, the condor and the huemul.	
	1834—c. 1940	This was an erroneous version that depicted a horse instead of a huemul, because that animal was unknown in most of the countries where the physical coats were manufactured.	
	1920—	In 1920, a decree officialized the use of the motto Por la razón o la fuerza, creating the current coat of arms.	
	1920—	Standardized version, used specially during the Military Dictatorship.	
