= Field sign =

Differentiating mark worn by combatants

A field sign is an unofficial differentiating mark worn on a combatant's clothing to show the difference between friend and foe or a combatant and a civilian.

== Examples ==
- A tabard in the livery colors of a lord and bearing his coat of arms was a common field sign.
- A sash of colored cloth worn on the waist or over the shoulder.
  - A red sash was worn by Imperial and Catholic troops of the Thirty Years War.
  - A black and yellow sash was worn by Swedish troops of the Thirty Years War.
- A bow of ribbon worn on the cap or hat.
  - A black bow was worn by the troops of the House of Hanover.
  - A white bow was worn by the House of Bourbon.
  - A red bow was worn by the House of Savoy.
  - An orange bow was worn by the House of Orange.
- The cockade (made originally of ribbon, cloth, or leather) is the best known type of field sign. The national and military insignia of most of the countries of Europe still use them today.
- Scottish clans had plant badges that they wore in battle to tell foe from ally.
- The Welsh leek badge (now believed to be a "St. Mary's Leek", or Dandelion) goes back to the Middle Ages. In 633 AD, the Welsh were sorely pressed by the invading Saxons. They met at the Battle of Heathfield, where there was a field filled with leeks. To distinguish themselves from the enemy, the Welsh wore the leeks in their hats—and subsequently gained a great victory over their enemies. To commemorate the victory they won, the Welsh soldiers were given the right to wear a leek pinned to their caps on 1 March, the feast of their national patron saint, St. David.
- A wheat sheaf around the arm was worn by Swedish troops of the House of Vasa.
- Irish Protestants and Ulster Unionists still wear the orange ribbon of the House of Orange today in their caps on 12 July "King Billy's Day". This commemorates the defeat of James II's Jacobite troops by the forces of William, Prince of Orange.
- Giuseppe Garibaldi's followers, who became the nucleus of the irregular Cacciatori delle alpi corps in 1859, wore their red shirts when they fought the Austrians.

== See also ==
- War flag – used by military forces to identify themselves
