= Charles Taylor (cricketer, born 1966) =

English cricketer

Personal information
- Full name: Charles William Taylor
- Born: 12 August 1966 (age 60); Banbury, Oxfordshire, England
- Batting: Left-handed
- Bowling: Left-arm medium-fast

Domestic team information
- Years: Team
- 1990–1995: Middlesex
- 1986: Oxfordshire

Career statistics
Competition	First-class	List A
Matches	33	12
Runs scored	175	8
Batting average	10.93	8.00
100s/50s	–/–	–/–
Top score	28*	3*
Balls bowled	4,453	425
Wickets	72	8
Bowling average	33.62	43.87
5 wickets in innings	1	–
10 wickets in match	–	–
Best bowling	5/33	2/33
Catches/stumpings	6/–	5/–
- Source: Cricinfo, 16 March 2012

Charles William Taylor (born 12 August 1966) is a former English cricketer. Taylor was a left-handed batsman who bowled left-arm medium-fast. He was born at Banbury, Oxfordshire.

Taylor first appeared in county cricket for Oxfordshire, making a single appearance for his home county in the 1986 Minor Counties Championship against Devon. Taylor later made his first-class debut for Middlesex against Nottinghamshire in the 1990 County Championship. He made 32 further first-class appearances for the county, the last of which came against Oxford University in 1995. A bowler capable of brisk pace, in his 33 first-class appearances for Middlesex, he took a total of 72 wickets at an average of 33.62, with best figures of 5/33. These figures were his only first-class five wicket haul and came against Yorkshire in his second first-class appearance in 1990. His most successful season with the ball came in 1992, when he featured in eighteen first-class matches, taking 35 wickets at an average of 40.71. With the bat, he scored a total of 175 runs during his career, which came at a batting average of 10.93, with a high score of 28 not out.

Taylor also played List A cricket for Middlesex, with his debut in that format coming against Gloucestershire in the 1991 Refuge Assurance League. He made eleven further List A appearances for the county, the last of which came against Yorkshire in the 1994 AXA Equity & Law League. In his twelve List A appearances, he took a total of 8 wickets at an average of 43.87, with best figures of 2/33. His career ended in a freak accident in which he injured his back, while changing the tyre on his car after suffering a puncture when the security poles inside the Grace Gates at Lord's activated while he was driving over them.
