= Charlie Taylor (footballer, born 1884) =

Australian rules footballer

Personal information
- Full name: Charles Everate Taylor
- Born: 6 October 1884; Woodend, Victoria
- Died: 13 June 1953 (aged 68); Thornbury, Victoria
- Original team: Police
- Height: 180 cm (5 ft 11 in)
- Weight: 86 kg (190 lb)

Playing career^{1}
Years	Club	Games (Goals)
1907–09	Fitzroy	20 (0)
- ^{1} Playing statistics correct to the end of 1909.

Charles Everate Taylor (6 October 1884 – 13 June 1953) was an Australian rules footballer who played with Fitzroy in the Victorian Football League (VFL).
