= Targe =

Type of shield, 13th to 16th centuries

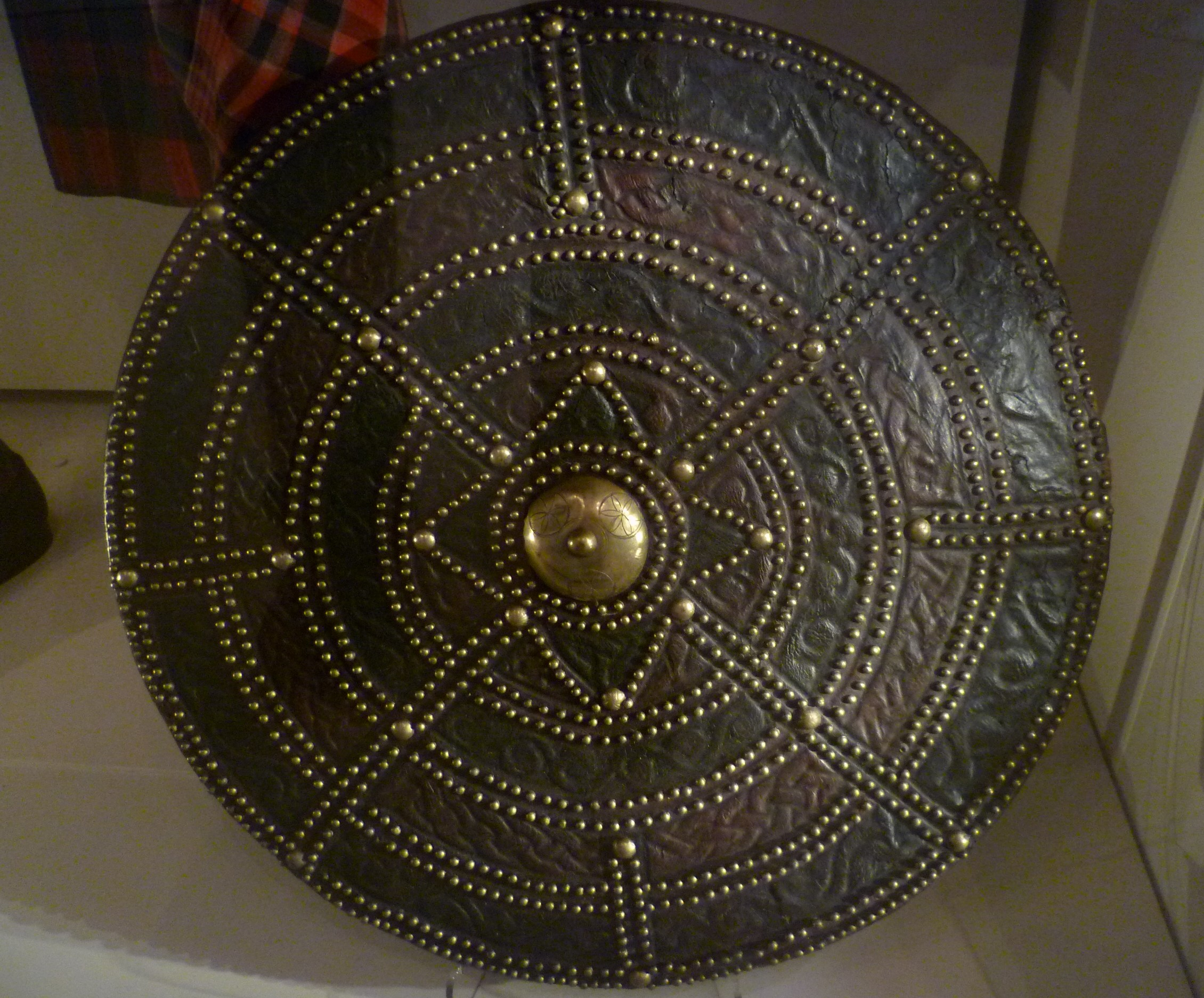
A Highland targe exhibited in the National Museum of Scotland

The targe (Scottish Gaelic: Targaid) is a type of strapped round shield that was used by Scottish Highlanders in the early modern period. From the late 16th century, until the Battle of Culloden in 1746, the Scottish Highlander's main means of defence in battle was his targe. In February 1596, the clan leader John Grant of Freuchie was able to muster 500 men, including 40 armed "according to the Highland custom" with bows, helmets, swords, and targes. After the disastrous defeat of the Jacobites at Culloden, the carrying of the targe ("target", as it was referred to in the original text of the legislation) was banned by a 1746 amendment to the 1715 Disarming Act, and many were destroyed or put to other uses. Those that remain have intricate patterns and are decorated, indicating that they would have originally belonged to important people.

The targe is a concave shield fitted with enarmes on the inside, one adjustable by a buckle, to be attached to the forearm, and the other fixed as a grip for the left hand.

== Etymology ==
Targe (from Frankish targa 'shield', from Proto-Germanic *targo 'border') was a general word for a shield in late Old English. Its diminutive, target, came to mean an object to be aimed at in the 18th century.

The term refers to various types of shields used by infantry troops from the 13th to 16th centuries, or earlier. From the 15th century, the term could also refer to special shields used for jousting. A fair number were created wholly for show.

== Structure of the Scottish targe ==
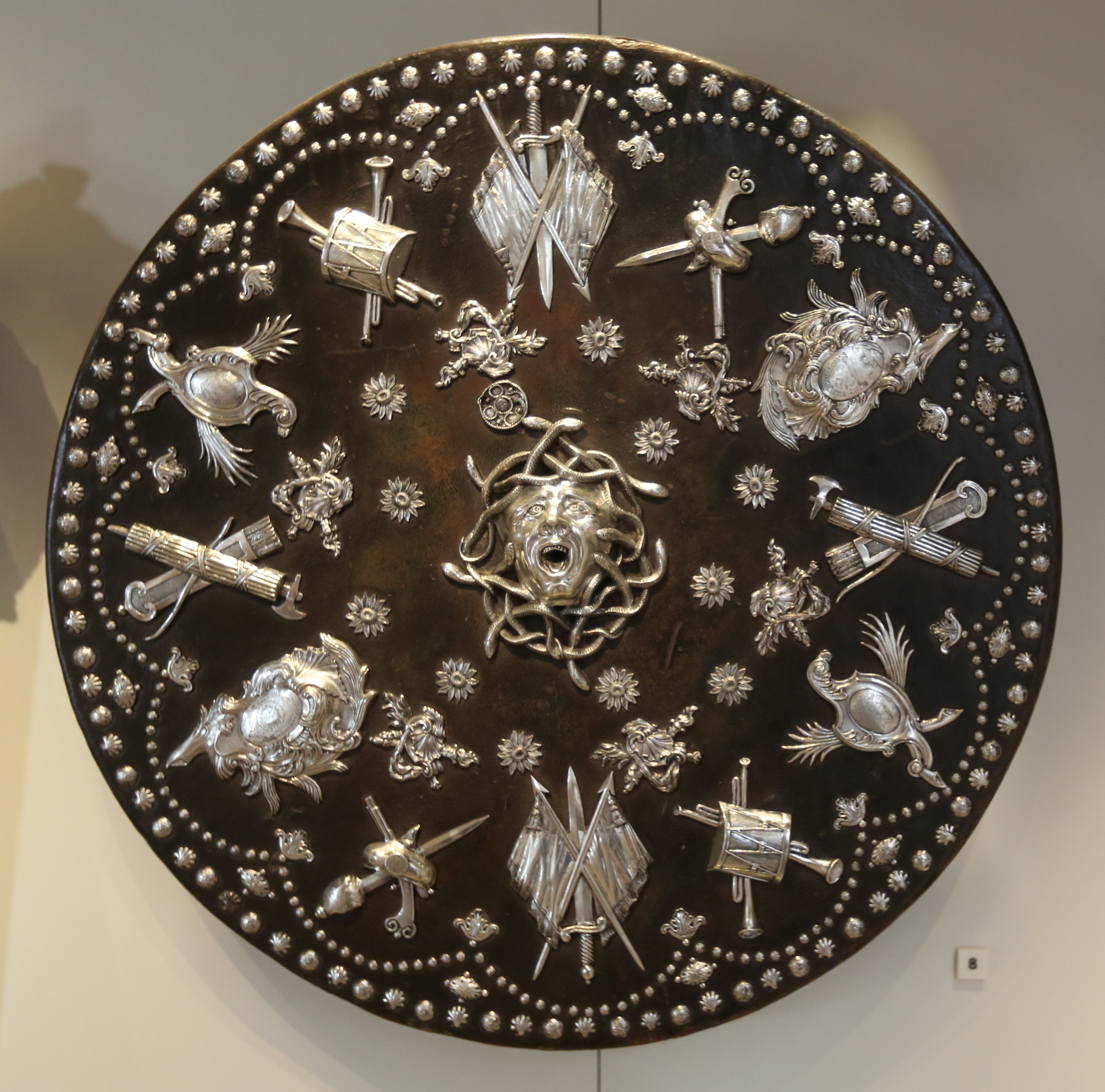
Charles Edward Stuart's highly decorated targe (1745)

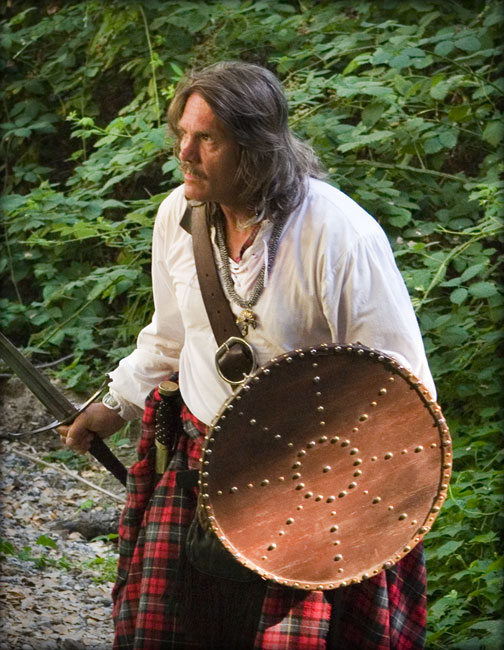
Scottish reenactor wielding a targe

Targes are generally round shields between 18 in and 21 in (45–55 cm) in diameter. The inside of the targe was formed from two very thin layers of flat wooden boards, with the grain of each layer at right angles to the other. They were fixed together with small wooden pegs, forming plywood. The front was covered with a tough cowhide, which was often decorated with embossed Celtic style patterns. This was fixed to the wood with many brass, or in some cases, silver, nails, and occasionally brass plates were also fixed to the face for strength and decoration. Targes generally had center bosses of brass. A Highlander was usually armed with a broadsword or dagger in one hand and targe on his other arm for close combat. It was also common for a dirk to be held in the targe hand, with the blade extending below the targe.

The back of the targe was commonly covered in deerskin, and a very few had some packing of straw etc. behind this. Although all the old targes show signs of handles and arm straps, of various designs including centre-grips, there is very little evidence to indicate that there was any guige strap for carrying the targe over the shoulder.

== See also ==
- Buckler
