= Escutcheon (heraldry) =

Main or focal element in an achievement of arms

In heraldry, an escutcheon (/ɪˈskʌtʃən/, ih-SKUTCH-ən) is a shield that forms the main or focal element in an achievement of arms. The word can be used in two related senses. In the first sense, an escutcheon is the shield upon which a coat of arms is displayed. In the second sense, an escutcheon can itself be a charge within a coat of arms.

Escutcheon shapes are derived from actual shields that were used by knights in combat, and thus are varied and developed by region and by era. Since shields have been regarded as military equipment appropriate for men only, British ladies customarily bear their arms upon a lozenge, or diamond-shape, while clergymen and ladies in continental Europe bear their arms upon a cartouche, or oval. Other shapes are also in use, such as the roundel commonly used for arms granted to Aboriginal Canadians by the Canadian Heraldic Authority, or the Nguni shield used in African heraldry (likewise, Christian organisations and Masonic bodies tend to use the same shape, also known as a vesica piscis).

Although an escutcheon can be used as a charge on its own, the most common use of an escutcheon charge is to display another coat of arms as a form of marshalling. Such escutcheon charges are usually given the same shape as the main shield. When there is only one escutcheon charge, it is sometimes called an inescutcheon.

The word escutcheon (late 15th century) is based on Old North French escuchon ('shield'). (Note: Ultimately from Vulgar Latin scūtiōn-, Latin scūtum, 'shield'. From its use in heraldry, the term escutcheon can be a metaphor for a family's honour. The idiom "a blot on the escutcheon" is used to mean a stain on somebody's reputation.)

== Shapes ==
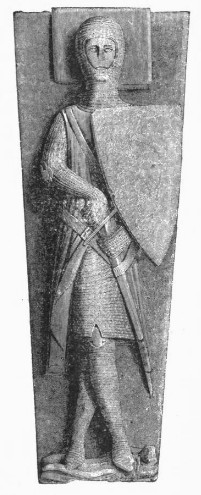
Effigy of William Longespée the Younger (d.1250) in Salisbury Cathedral, showing an early triangular heater shield, the shape used as the "canvas" for the display of arms during the classical age of heraldry

The earliest depictions of proto-heraldic shields in the second half of the 12th century still have the shape of the Norman kite shield used throughout the 11th and 12th centuries. By about the 1230s, shields used by heavy cavalry had become shorter and more triangular, now called heater shields.

Transitional forms intermediate between kite and heater are seen in the late 12th to early 13th centuries. Transition to the heater was essentially complete by 1250. For example, the shield of William II Longespée (d. 1250) shown with his effigy at Salisbury Cathedral is triangular, while the shield shown on the effigy of his father William Longespée, 3rd Earl of Salisbury (d. 1226) is still of a more elongated form.

The shield on the enamel monument to Geoffrey V, Count of Anjou (d. 1151) is of almost full-body length. The heater was used in warfare during the apogee of the Age of Chivalry, at about the time of the Battle of Crecy (1346) and the founding of the Order of the Garter (1348). The shape is therefore used in armorials from this "classical age" of heraldry.

Beginning in the 15th century, and even more throughout the early modern period, a great variety of escutcheon shapes developed. In the Tudor era the heraldic escutcheon became more square, taking the shape of an inverted Tudor arch. Continental European designs frequently use the various forms used in jousting, which incorporate "mouths" used as lance rests into the shields; such escutcheons are known as à bouche. The mouth is correctly shown on the dexter side only, as jousting pitches were designed for right-handed knights. Heraldic examples of English shields à bouche can be seen in the spandrels of the trussed timber roof of Lincoln's Inn Hall, London.

The shape of the top, the sides and the base may be separately described, and these elements may be freely combined. The highly complex Baroque style shields of the 17th century come in many artistic variations.

Kite shield, 12th/13th century

"Norman" style, 13th century

"Early Heater" shape, 13th century

"Heater" shape, 13th/14th century

Square ("Old French") shape

"Square Iberian" or Iberian style (square top, rounded base), 15th century

Bouched or bouché side ("German" or "Dutch" style), 15th century. (Note: The gap or bouche represents the opening for the lance in specialised jousting shields, attested (in depictions of actual shields) from the mid 14th century, occasional use as a shape of heraldic escutcheons from the mid-15th century.)

"Old Denish" style, 15th century

Scroll-eared top, lobed base, 16th century

Square eared, nicked top, rounded base, 16th century

"Wedge" top

"Polish" style, 17th century

Eared top, French base

"French" style, 17th century (Note: Used in the Armorial général de France (1696). The "French" shape of the base is found earlier, in French and English heraldry, from c. 1600 ("Stuart" type).)

Two engrailed top, 19th century (Note: called ecu suisse in some French sources of the 19th century, as this shape was used in coats of arms on some coins of the Swiss mediation period (1803–1815).)

Oval or "Iberian" shape

Lozenge shape (see Lozenge section)

Italian, or horsehead, shape

=== Lozenge ===
Pippa Middleton's coat of arms (granted 2011), based on those of her father. This lozenge version, supported by a blue ribbon, denotes an unmarried woman.

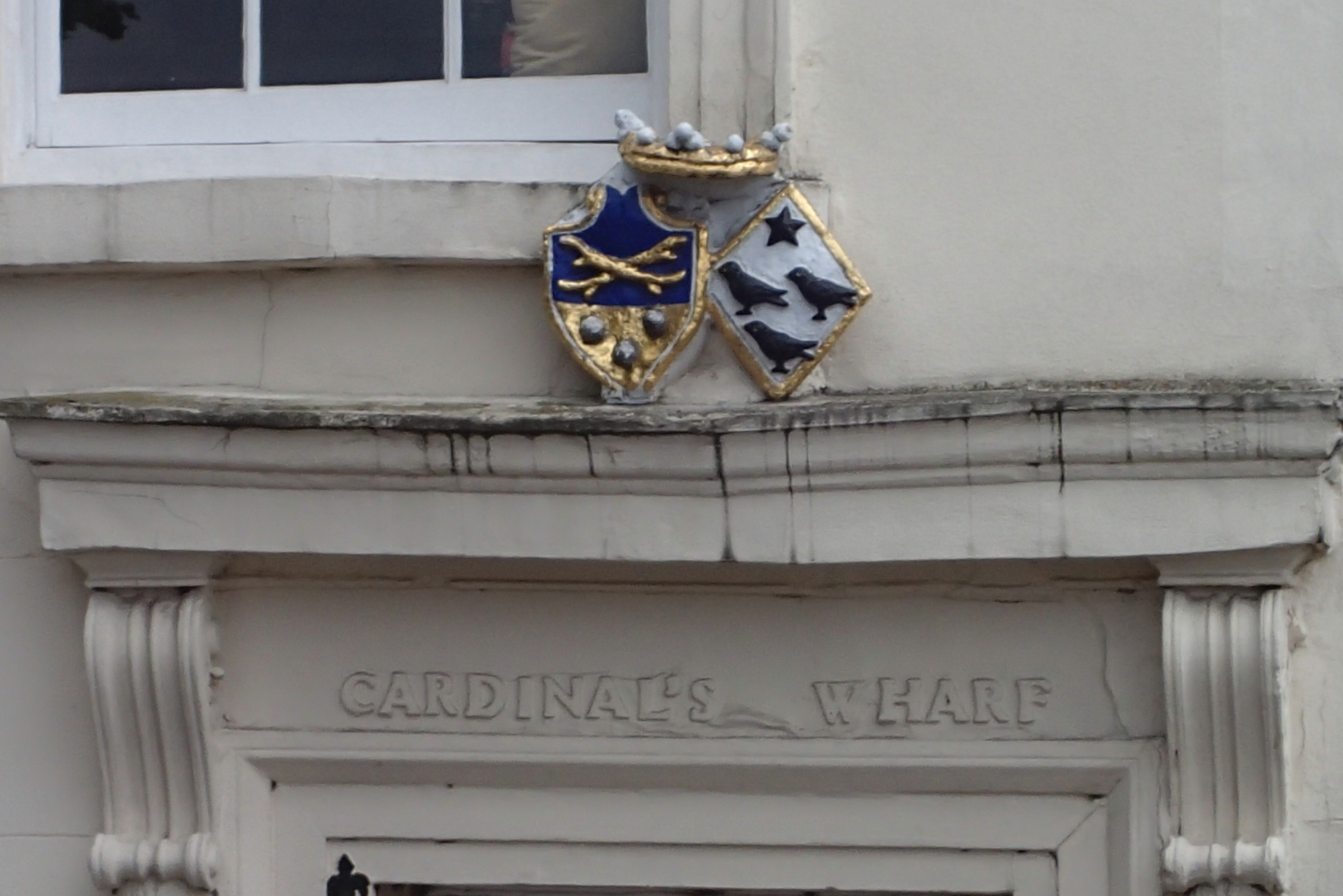
Male (shield-shaped) and female (lozenge-shaped) coats of arms in relief in Southwark, London.

In English heraldry, the lozenge has been used by women since the 13th century for the display of their coats of arms instead of the escutcheon or shield, which are associated with warfare. In this case the lozenge is shown without crest or helm. For the practical purpose of categorisation the lozenge may be treated as a variety of heraldic escutcheon.

Traditionally, very limited categories of women would have been able to display their own arms, for example a female monarch—who uses an escutcheon as a military commander, not a lozenge—and suo jure peeresses, who may display their own arms alone on a lozenge even if married. In general a woman was represented by her paternal arms impaled by the arms of her husband on an escutcheon as a form of marshalling.

In modern Canadian heraldry, and certain other modern heraldic jurisdictions, women may be granted their own arms and display these on an escutcheon. Life peeresses in England display their arms on a lozenge. An oval or cartouche is occasionally also used instead of the lozenge for armigerous women.

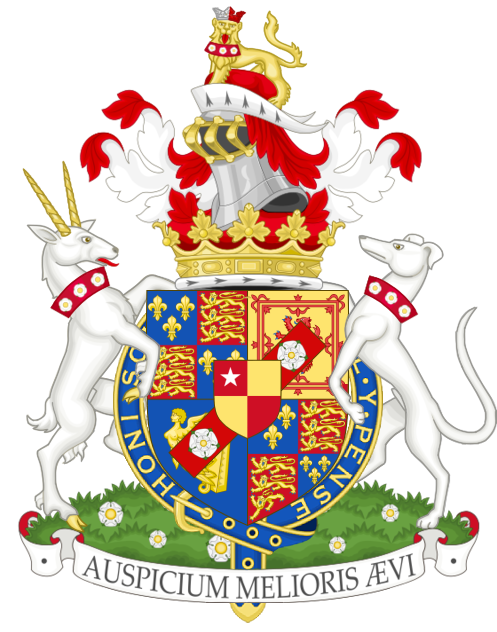
Arms of Charles Beauclerk, 1st Duke of St Albans who married the heraldic heiress of the Earls of Oxford with an escutcheon of pretence. The Oxford arms are incorporated into the arms of his son, the 2nd Duke of St Albans, on the right.

As a result of rulings of the English Kings of Arms dated 7 April 1995 and 6 November 1997, married women in England, Northern Ireland and Wales and in other countries recognising the jurisdiction of the College of Arms in London (such as New Zealand) also have the option of using their husband's arms alone, marked with a small lozenge as a difference to show that the arms are displayed for the wife and not the husband; or of using their own personal arms alone, marked with a small shield as a brisure for the same reason. Divorced women may theoretically until remarriage use their ex-husband's arms differenced with a mascle. Widowed women normally display a lozenge-shaped shield impaled, unless they are heraldic heiresses, in which case they display a lozenge-shaped shield with the unaltered escutcheon of pretence in the centre. Women in same-sex marriages may use a shield or banner to combine arms, but can use only a lozenge or banner when one of the spouses dies.

== Points ==
The points of the shield refer to specific positions thereon and are used in blazons to describe where a charge should be placed.

Points of an escutcheon or heraldic shield

1. Chief: very top of the shield, corresponding to where the ordinary chief begins
2. Dexter: right side of shield when worn (viewer's left)
3. Sinister: left side of shield when worn (viewer's right)
4. Base: very bottom
5. Dexter Chief: top-right corner
6. Middle Chief: top-middle
7. Sinister Chief: top-left corner
8. Honour Point: halfway between the middle chief and fess point
9. Fess Point (or Abyss): exact middle
10. Nombril Point: halfway between the base and the honour point or between the middle base and the fess point
11. Dexter Base: bottom-right
12. Sinister Base: bottom-left
13. Middle Base (seldom used): bottom-middle

== Inescutcheon ==
Arms of Birgitte, Duchess of Gloucester. It depicts her father's arms imposed over her husband's (Richard, Duke of Gloucester) as an inescutcheon

An inescutcheon is a smaller escutcheon that is placed within or superimposed over the main shield of a coat of arms. In practice, the words inescutcheon and escutcheon are often used interchangeably.

== Pelta escutcheon ==
Pelta escutcheon as used in the diplomatic emblem of France

The current diplomatic emblem of France incorporates the pelta escutcheon, a wide form of shield (or gorget) with a small animal head pointing inward at each end. This is Roman in origin; although not the shape of their classic shield, many brooches of this shape survive from antiquity. A form of pelta appears as a decoration above the head of every official on the Austerlitz table, commissioned by Napoleon for propaganda purposes.

== Console ==
A strapwork heraldic console, fashionable in the second half of the 16th century

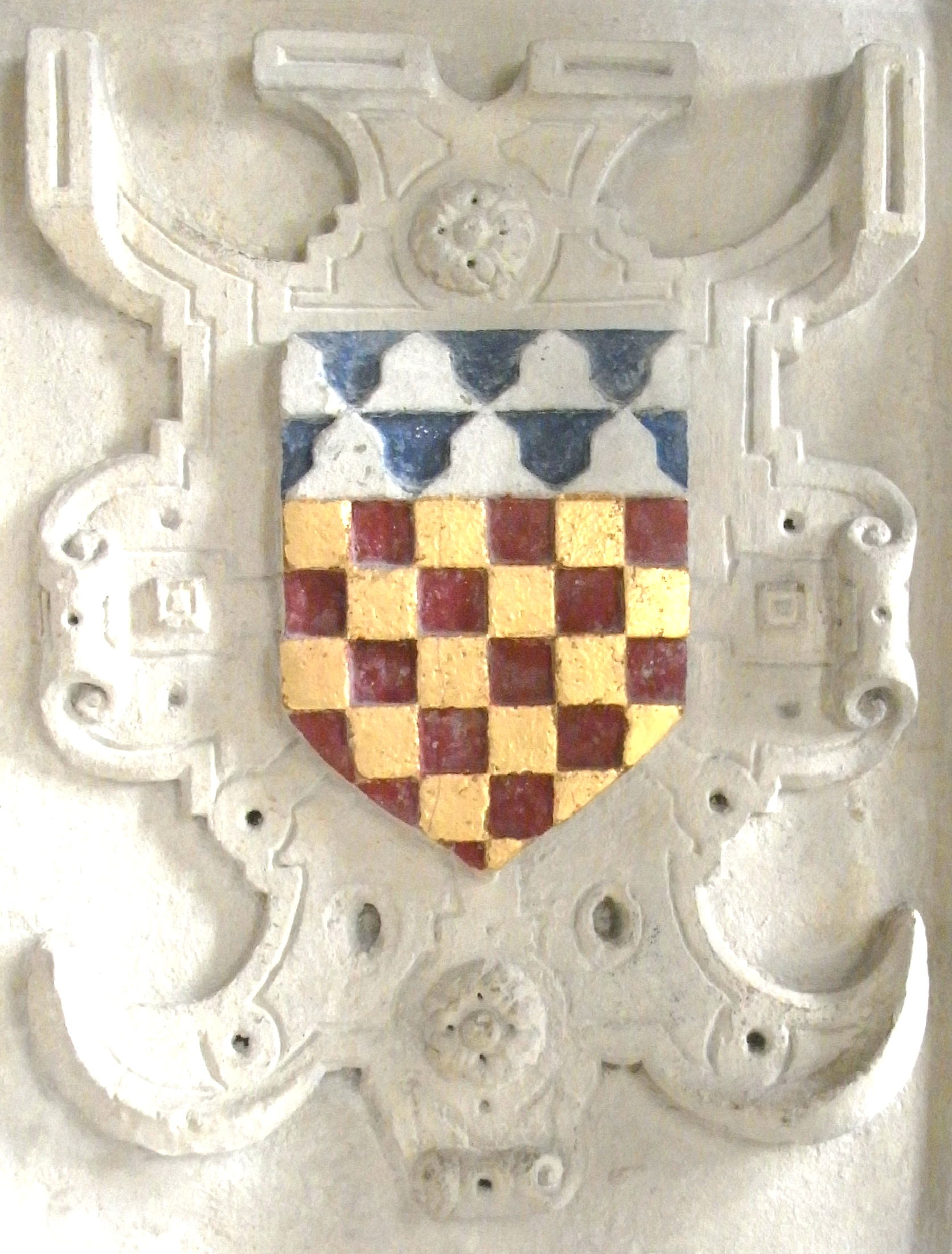
Console from Chichester tomb, Pilton, Devon, 1569

The term "console" in architecture is generally used for elements which provide support, such as corbels on a console table. (Note: The term derives from the compound Latin verb consolor "to alleviate, lighten", from the verb solor, "to assuage, soothe, relieve, mitigate", plus the preposition con/com/cum, "with".) A console in heraldry is a decorative frame or support, generally in an architectural or illustrative context, surrounding a heraldic shield or escutcheon, which serves to add interest to and mitigate the harshness of the stark outline of the shield.
