= Kite shield =

European medieval shield

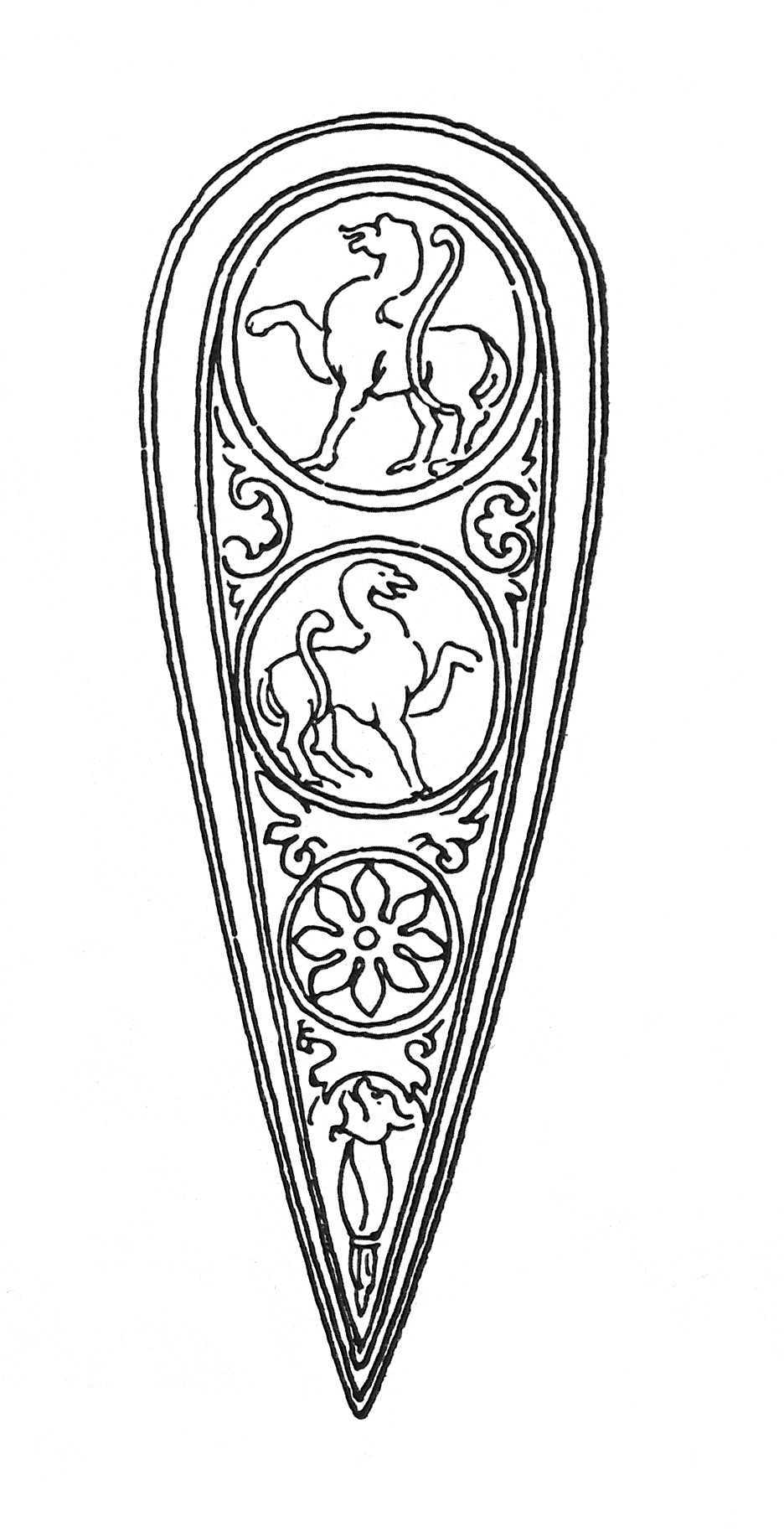
Norman-style kite shield.

A kite shield is a large, almond-shaped shield rounded at the top and curving down to a point or rounded point at the bottom. The term "kite shield" is a reference to the shield's unique shape, and is derived from its supposed similarity to a flying kite, although "leaf-shaped shield" and "almond shield" have also been used in recent literature. Since the most prominent examples of this shield have appeared on the Bayeux Tapestry, the kite shield has become closely associated with Norman warfare.

== History ==
It is often speculated that the shield was developed for mounted cavalry, and that its dimensions correlate to the approximate space between a horse's neck and its rider's thigh. The narrow bottom is seen to be protecting the rider's left leg, and the pronounced upper curve, the rider's shoulder and torso. This is seen as an improvement over more common circular shields, which afforded poor protection to the horseman's left flank, especially when charging with a lance.

Kite shields gained popularity throughout Western Europe during the 1000s. In the Bayeux Tapestry, most of the English are depicted on foot with kite shields, while a minority still use round shields. Aside from Normandy, they also appeared early on in parts of Spain and the Holy Roman Empire. It is unclear from which of these three regions the design originated. A theory is that the kite shield was inherited by the Normans from their Viking predecessors. However, no documentation or remains of kite shields from the Viking era have been discovered, and they were not ideally suited to the Vikings' highly mobile light infantry. Kite shields were depicted primarily on eleventh century illustrations, largely in Western Europe and the Byzantine Empire, but also in the Caucasus, the Fatimid Caliphate, and among the Kievan Rus'. For example, an eleventh century silver engraving of Saint George recovered from Bochorma, Georgia, depicts a kite shield, as do other isolated pieces of Georgian art dating to the twelfth and thirteenth centuries. Kite shields also appear on the Bab al-Nasr in Cairo, which was constructed around 1087. Arab historians usually described them as tariqa or januwiyya.

Kite shields were introduced in large numbers to the Middle East by the First Crusade, when Arab and Byzantine soldiers first observed the type being carried by Norman crusaders; these left such a favourable impression on Byzantium that they had entirely superseded round shields in the Komnenian army by the mid twelfth century.

Around the mid to late twelfth century, traditional kite shields were largely replaced by a variant in which the top was flat, rather than rounded. This change made it easier for a soldier to hold the shield upright without limiting his field of vision. Flat-topped kite shields were later phased out by most Western European armies in favour of much smaller, more compact heater shields. However, they were still being carried by Byzantine infantry well into the thirteenth century.

== Construction ==
To compensate for their awkward nature, kite shields were equipped with enarmes, which gripped the shield tight to the arm and facilitated keeping it in place even when a knight relaxed his arm; this was a significant departure from most earlier circular shields as they possessed only a single handle. Some examples were apparently also fitted with an additional guige strap that allowed the shield to be slung over one shoulder when not in use. Byzantine infantry frequently carried kite shields on their backs while on the march, sometimes upside down. At the time of the First Crusade, most kite shields were still fitted with a domed metal centrepiece (shield boss), although the use of enarmes would have rendered them unnecessary. The shields may have been fitted with both enarmes and an auxiliary hand grip.

A typical kite shield was at least three to five feet high, being constructed of laminated wood, stretched animal hide, and iron components. Records from Byzantium in the 1200s suggests the shield frame accounted for most of the wood and iron; its body was constructed out of hide, parchment, or hardened leather, similar to the material used on drum faces.

== Gallery ==
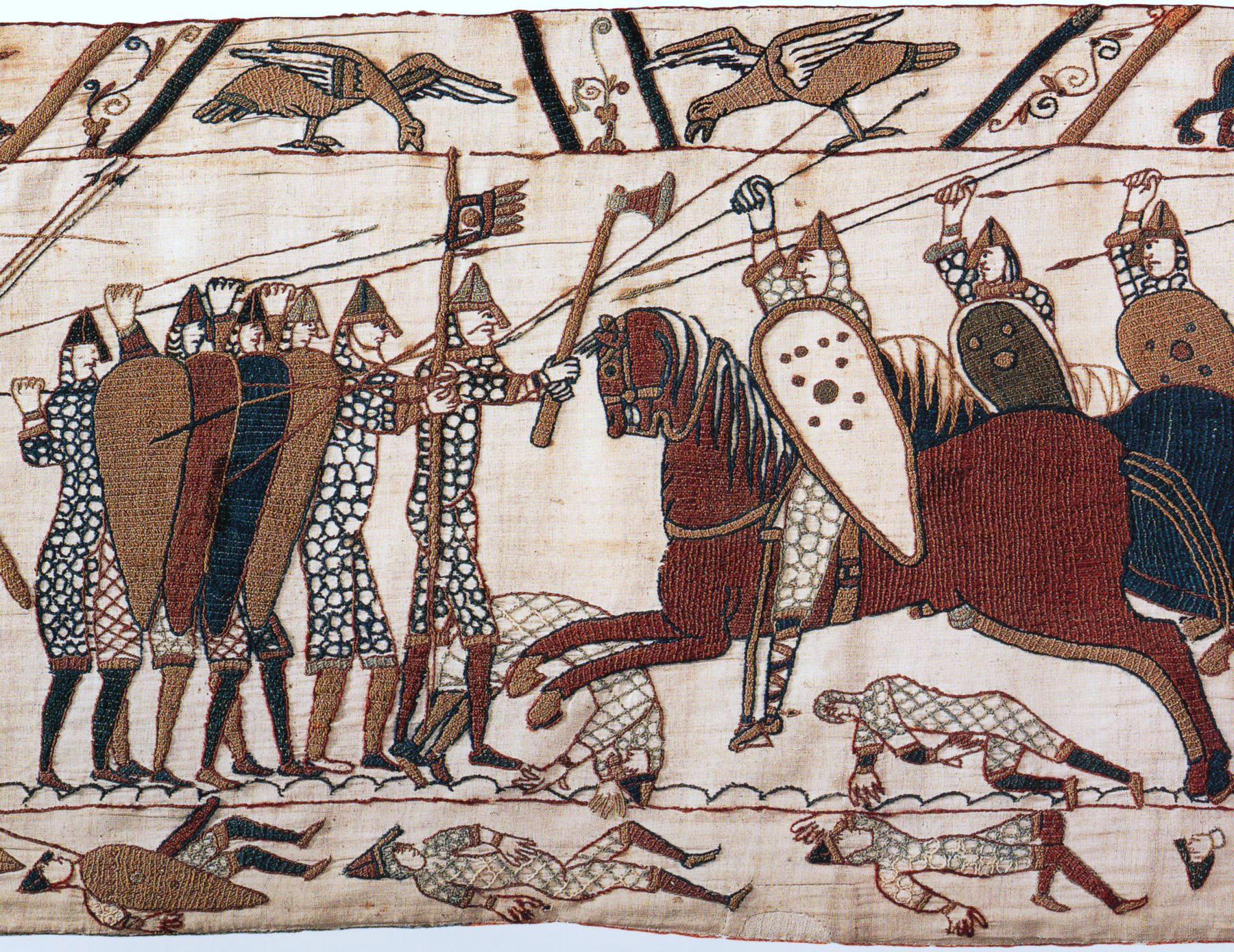
Kite shield on the Bayeux Tapestry

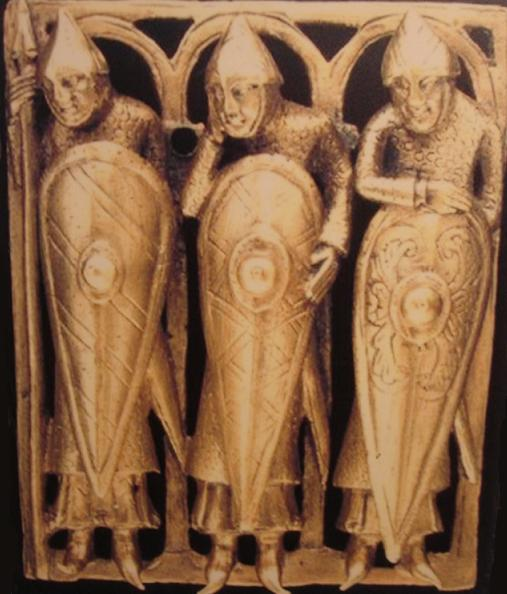
Kite shields as depicted on the Temple Pyx

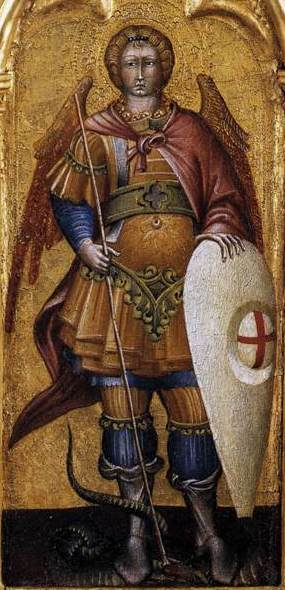
A 15th century depiction of the Archangel Michael with a kiteshield

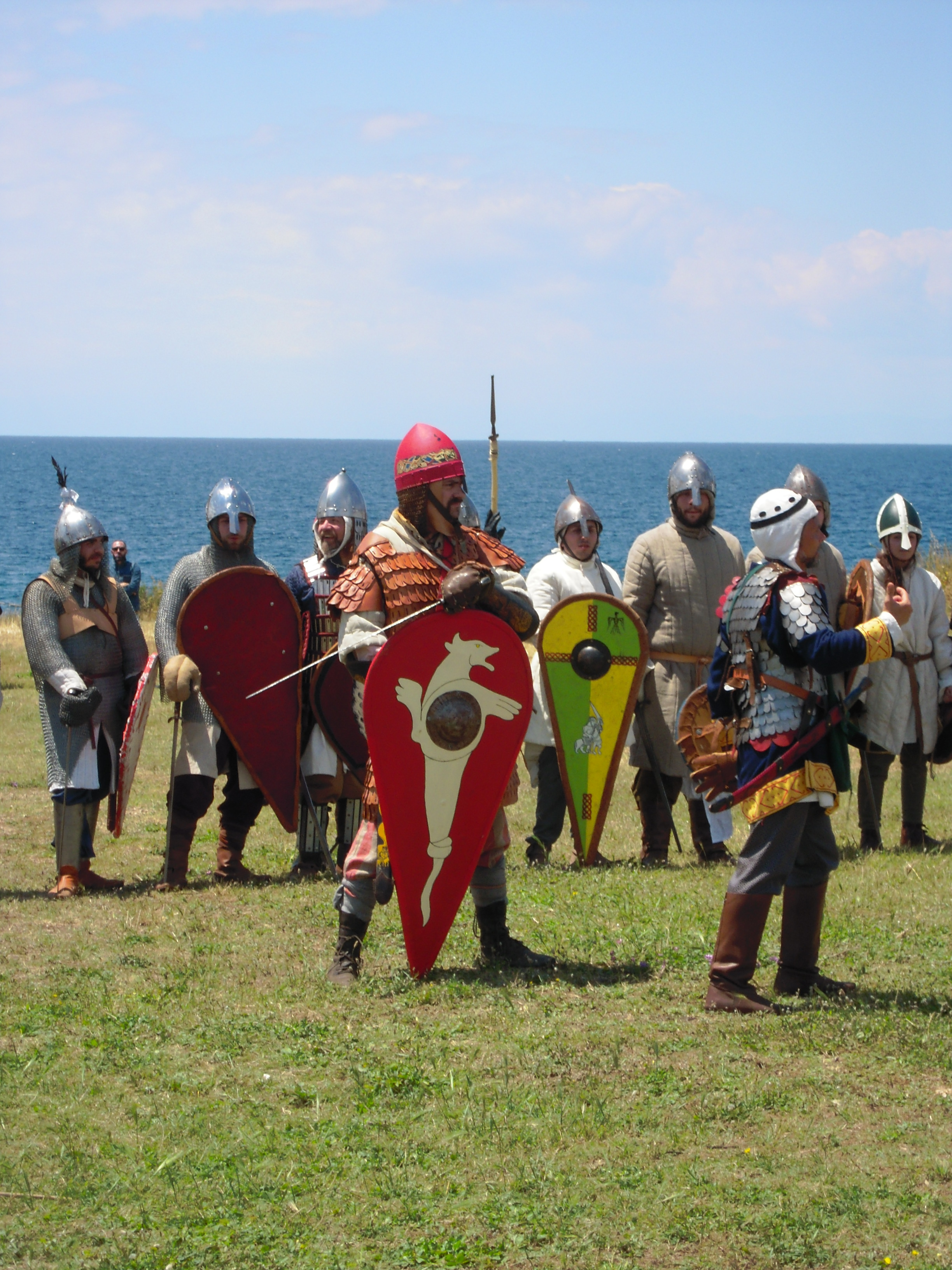
Reenactors with kite shields

== See also ==
- Heater shield
