= Peltast =

Type of Thracian light infantry

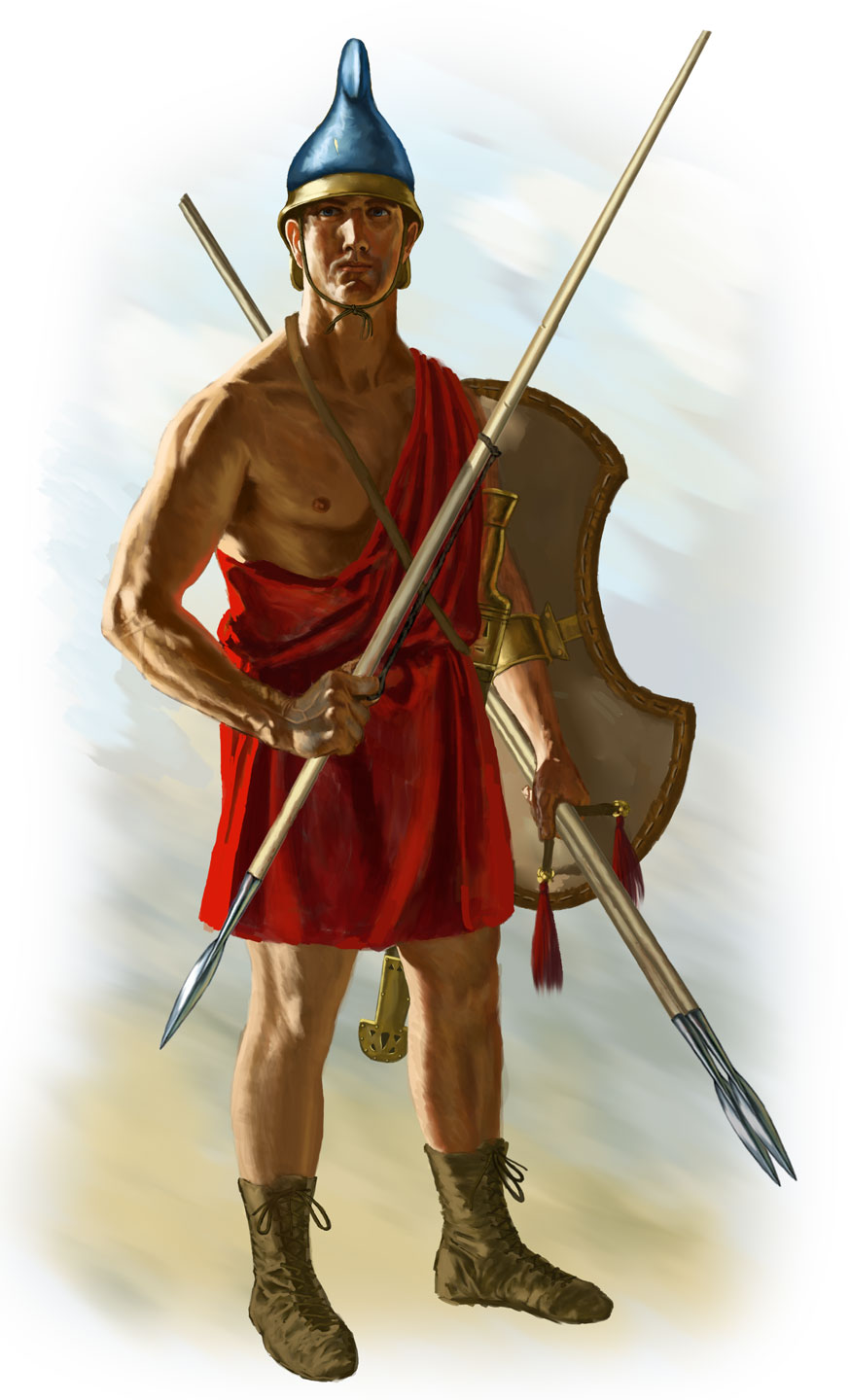
Agrianian peltas. This peltast holds three javelins, one in his throwing hand and two in his pelte (shield) hand as additional ammunition.

A peltast (Ancient Greek: πελταστής, peltastēs) was a type of light infantry originating in Thrace and Paeonia and named after the kind of shield they carried. Thucydides mentions the Thracian peltasts, while Xenophon in the Anabasis distinguishes the Thracian and Greek peltast troops.

The peltast often served as a skirmisher in Hellenistic armies. In the Middle Ages, the same term was used for a type of Byzantine infantryman.

== Description ==
=== Pelte shield ===
Peltasts carried a crescent-shaped wicker shield called a "pelte" (Ancient Greek πέλτη, peltē; Latin: pelta (Note: The diminutives peltarion (Greek) and peltarium (Latin, both "little shield") are used in biology to describe unrelated structures and organisms, but published historians do not appear to have used the terms for the actual shields. The specific names and epithets peltatus, peltata and peltatum ("having a pelta") are also used in taxonomy.)) as their main protection, hence their name. According to Aristotle, the pelte was rimless and covered in goat- or sheepskin. Some literary sources imply that the shield could be round, but in art it is usually shown as crescent-shaped. It also appears in Scythian art and may have been a common type in Central and Eastern Europe. The shield could be carried with a central strap and a handgrip near the rim or with just a central hand-grip. It may also have had a carrying strap (or guige), as Thracian peltasts slung their shields on their backs when evading the enemy.

=== Weapons ===
Peltasts weapons consisted of several javelins, which may have had straps to allow more force to be applied to a throw.

The size of these javelins could differ greatly from a modern olympic-style javelin. Xenophon mentions in his Anabasis an encounter with hostile Carduchians, fighting with longbows, wherein the Greeks reused carduchian arrows as javelins.

They were, moreover, excellent archers, using bows nearly three cubits long and arrows more than two cubits (86 cm -112 cm). When discharging the arrow, they draw the string by getting a purchase with the left foot planted forward on the lower end of the bow. The arrows pierced through shield and cuirass, and the Hellenes, when they got hold of them, used them as javelins, fitting them to their thongs.

== Development ==
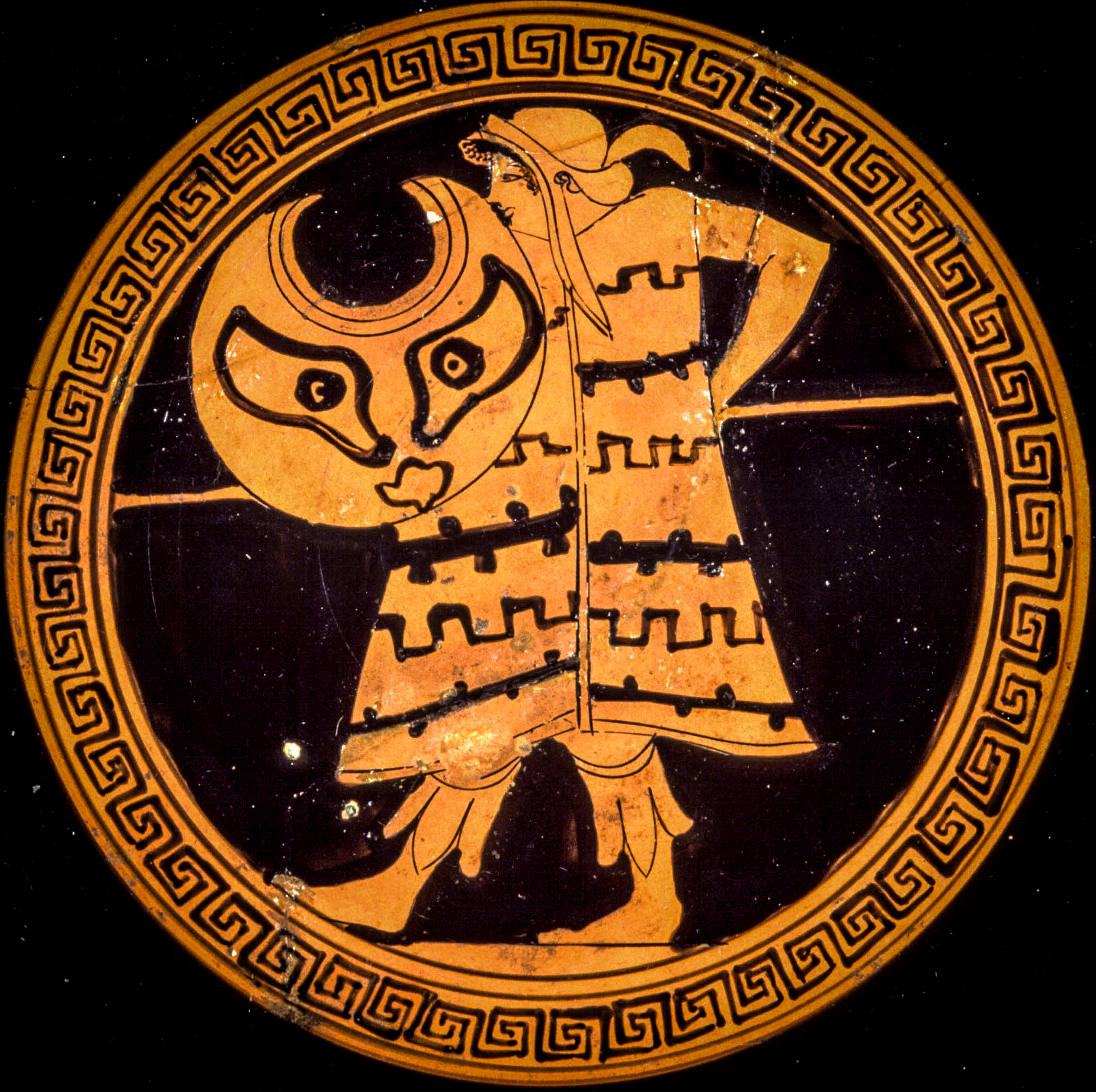
A peltast with the whole of his panoply (on a red-figure kylix)

In Archaic Greece, the Greek martial tradition had been focused almost exclusively on the heavy infantry, or hoplites.

The style of fighting used by peltasts originated in Thrace, and the first Greek peltasts were recruited from the Greek cities of the Thracian coast. They are generally depicted on vases and in other images as wearing the typical Thracian costume, which includes the distinctive Phrygian cap made of fox-skin and with ear flaps. They also usually wore patterned tunics, fawnskin boots and long cloaks, called zeiras, decorated with a bright, geometric, pattern. However, many mercenary peltasts were probably recruited in Greece. Some vases have also been found showing hoplites (men wearing Corinthian helmets, greaves and cuirasses, holding hoplite spears) carrying peltes. Often, the mythical Amazons (women warriors) are shown with peltast equipment.

Peltasts gradually became more important in Greek warfare, in particular during the Peloponnesian War.

Xenophon, in the Anabasis, describes peltasts in action against Achaemenid cavalry at the Battle of Cunaxa in 401 BC, where they were serving as part of the mercenary force of Cyrus the Younger.

Tissaphernes had not fled at the first charge (by the Greek troops), but had instead charged along the river through the Greek peltasts. However he did not kill a single man as he passed through. The Greeks opened their ranks (to allow the Persian cavalry through) and proceeded to deal blows (with swords) and throw javelins at them as they went through.

Xenophon's description makes it clear that these peltasts were armed with swords, as well as javelins, but not with spears. When faced with a charge from the Persian cavalry, they opened their ranks and allowed the cavalry through while striking them with swords and hurling javelins at them.

Peltasts on the Tomb of Payava
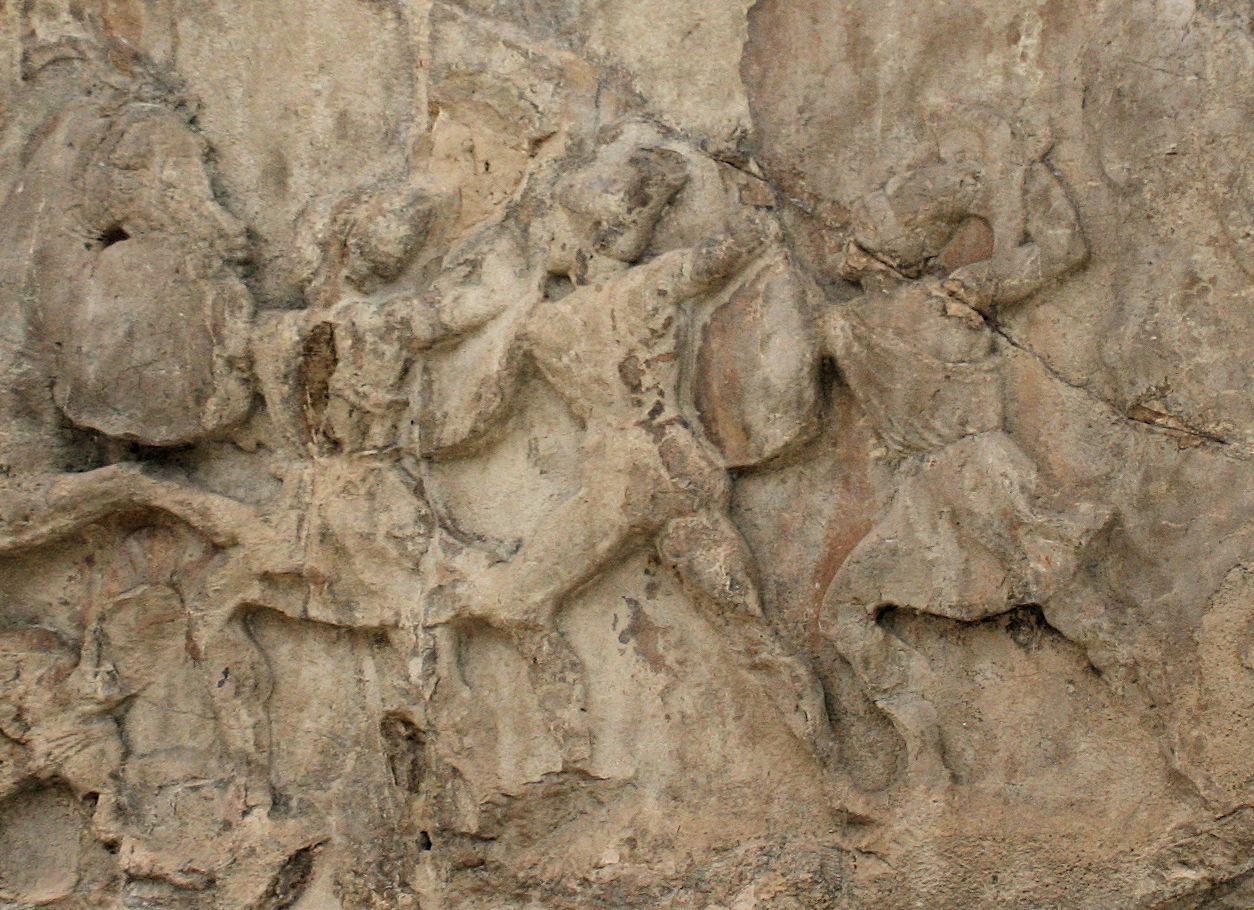
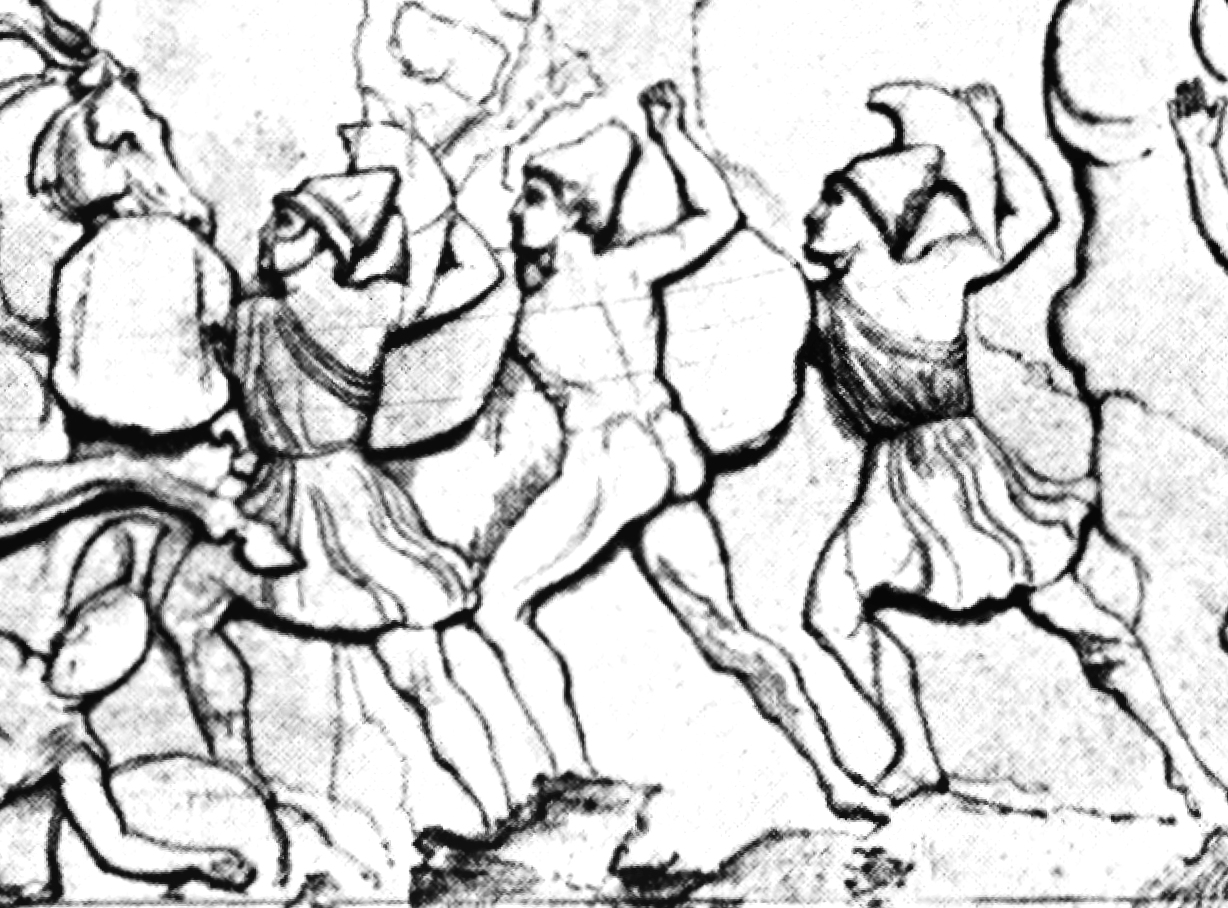
Peltasts on the Tomb of Payava (c. 360 BC), around the time of Iphicrates. They are equipped with the exomis, the pilos with crest and cheekpiece, and the round pelte shield, thrusting overarm with a spear.

Peltasts became the main type of Greek mercenary infantry in the 4th century BC. Their equipment was less expensive than that of traditional hoplites and would have been more readily available to poorer members of society. The Athenian general Iphicrates destroyed a Spartan phalanx in the Battle of Lechaeum in 390 BC, using mostly peltasts. In the account of Diodorus Siculus, Iphicrates is credited with re-arming his men with long spears, perhaps in around 374 BC. This reform may have produced a type of "peltast" armed with a small shield, a sword, and a spear instead of javelins.

Some authorities, such as J.G.P. Best, state that these later "peltasts" were not truly peltasts in the traditional sense, but lightly armored hoplites carrying the pelte shield in conjunction with longer spears—a combination that has been interpreted as a direct ancestor to the Macedonian phalanx. However, thrusting spears are included in some illustrations of peltasts before the time of Iphicrates and some peltasts may have carried them as well as javelins rather than as a replacement for them. As no battle accounts describe peltasts using thrusting spears, it may be that they were sometimes carried by individuals by choice (rather than as part of a policy or reform). The Lykian sarcophagus of Payava from about 400 BC depicts a soldier carrying a round pelte, but using a thrusting spear overarm. He wears a pilos helmet with cheekpieces, but no armour. His equipment therefore resembles Iphicrates's supposed new troops. Fourth-century BC peltasts also seem to have sometimes worn both helmets and linen armour.

Alexander the Great employed peltasts drawn from the Thracian tribes to the north of Macedonia, particularly the Agrianoi. In the 3rd century BC, peltasts were gradually replaced with thureophoroi infantrymen. Later references to peltasts may not in fact refer to their style of equipment as the word peltast became a synonym for mercenary.

== Anatolian ==
Athenian peltast
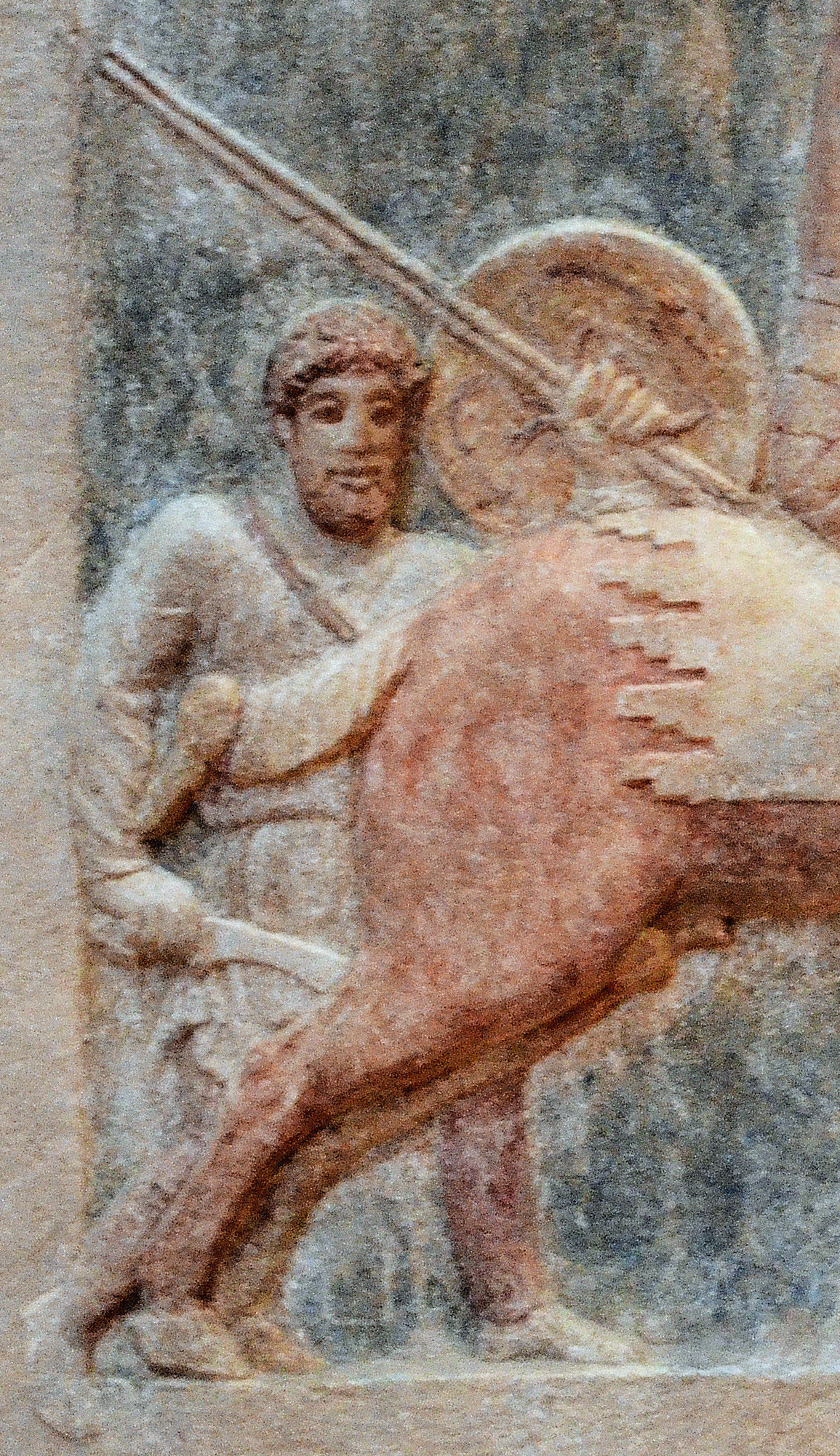
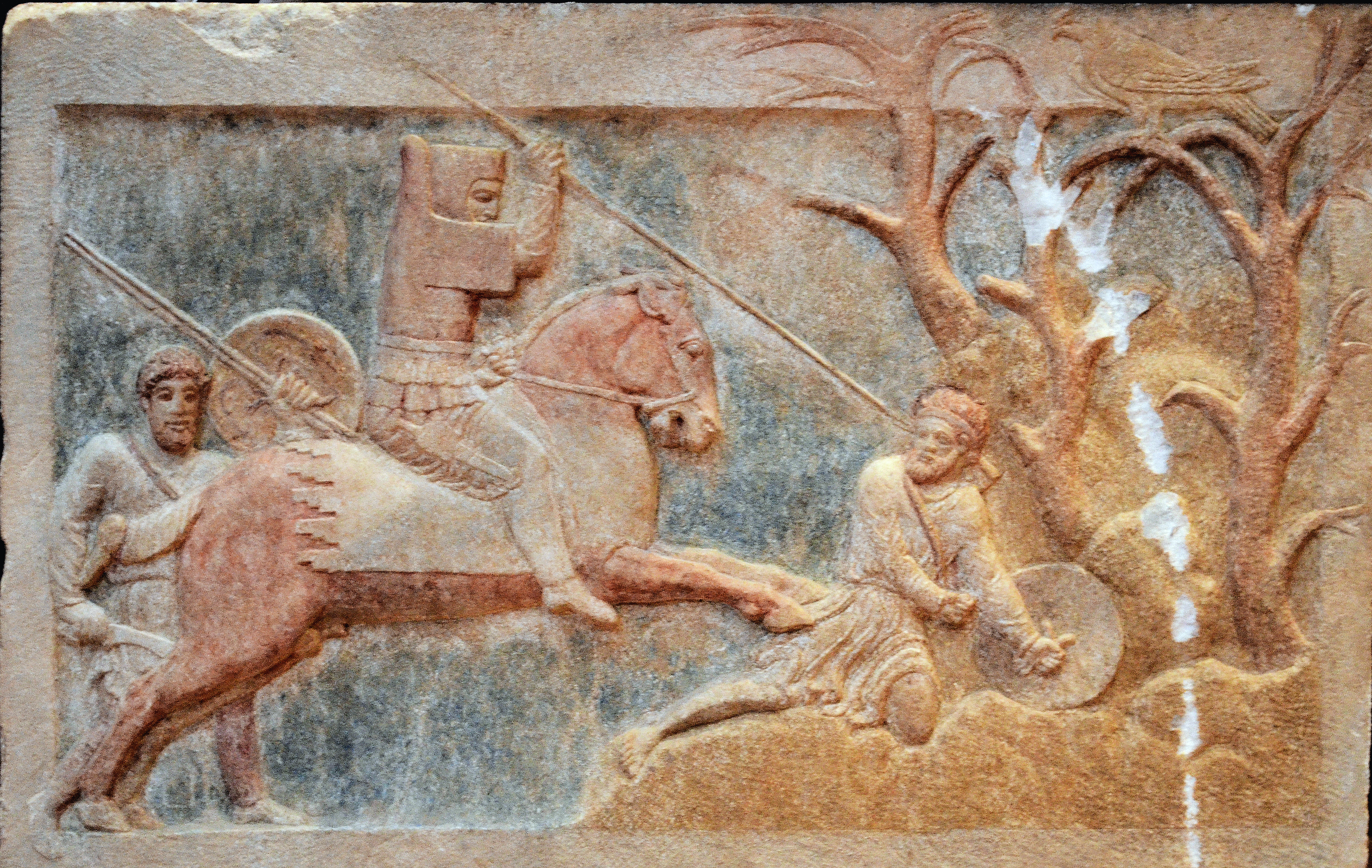
An Athenian mercenary peltast (left) supporting an Achaemenid knight of Hellespontine Phrygia (center) attacking a Greek psilos (right), Altıkulaç Sarcophagus, early 4th century BC. The Athenian peltast is equipped with a machaira sword, a small round shield with a single grip, with javelins wedged in the grip, making him an effective fighter in close quarters against a disorganized enemy.

A tradition of fighting with javelins, light shield and sometimes a spear existed in Anatolia and several contingents armed like this appeared in Xerxes I's army that invaded Greece in 480 BC. For example, the Paphlagonians and Phrygians wore wicker helmets and native boots reaching halfway to the knee. They carried small shields, short spears, javelins and daggers.

== In the Persian army ==
From the mid-5th century BC onwards, peltast soldiers began to appear in Greek depictions of Persian troops. They were equipped like Greek and Thracian peltasts, but were dressed in typically Persian army uniforms. They often carried light axes, known as sagaris, as sidearms. It has been suggested that these troops were known in Persian as takabara and their shields as taka. The Persians may have been influenced by Greek and Thracian peltasts. Another alternative source of influence would have been the Anatolian hill tribes, such as the Corduene, Mysians or Pisidians. In Greek sources, these troops were either called peltasts or peltophoroi (bearers of pelte).

== In the Antigonid army ==
In the Hellenistic period, the Antigonid kings of Macedon had an elite corps of native Macedonian peltasts. However, this force should not be confused with the skirmishing peltasts discussed earlier. The peltasts were probably, according to F.W. Walbank, about 3,000 in number, although by the Third Macedonian War, this went up to 5,000 (most likely to accommodate the elite agema, which was a sub-unit in the peltast corps). The fact that they are always mentioned as being in their thousands suggests that, in terms of organization, the peltasts were organized into chiliarchies. This elite corps was most likely of the same status, of similar equipment and role as Alexander the Great's hypaspists. Within this corps of peltasts was its elite formation, the Agema. These troops were used on forced marches by Philip V of Macedon, which suggests that they were lightly equipped and mobile. However, at the battle of Pydna in 168 BC, Livy remarks on how the Macedonian peltasts defeated the Paeligni and of how this shows the dangers of going directly at the front of a phalanx. Though it may seem strange for a unit that would fight in phalanx formation to be called peltasts, pelte would not be an inappropriate name for a Macedonian shield. They may have been similarly equipped with the Iphicratean hoplites or peltasts, as described by Diodorus.

== Deployment and role ==
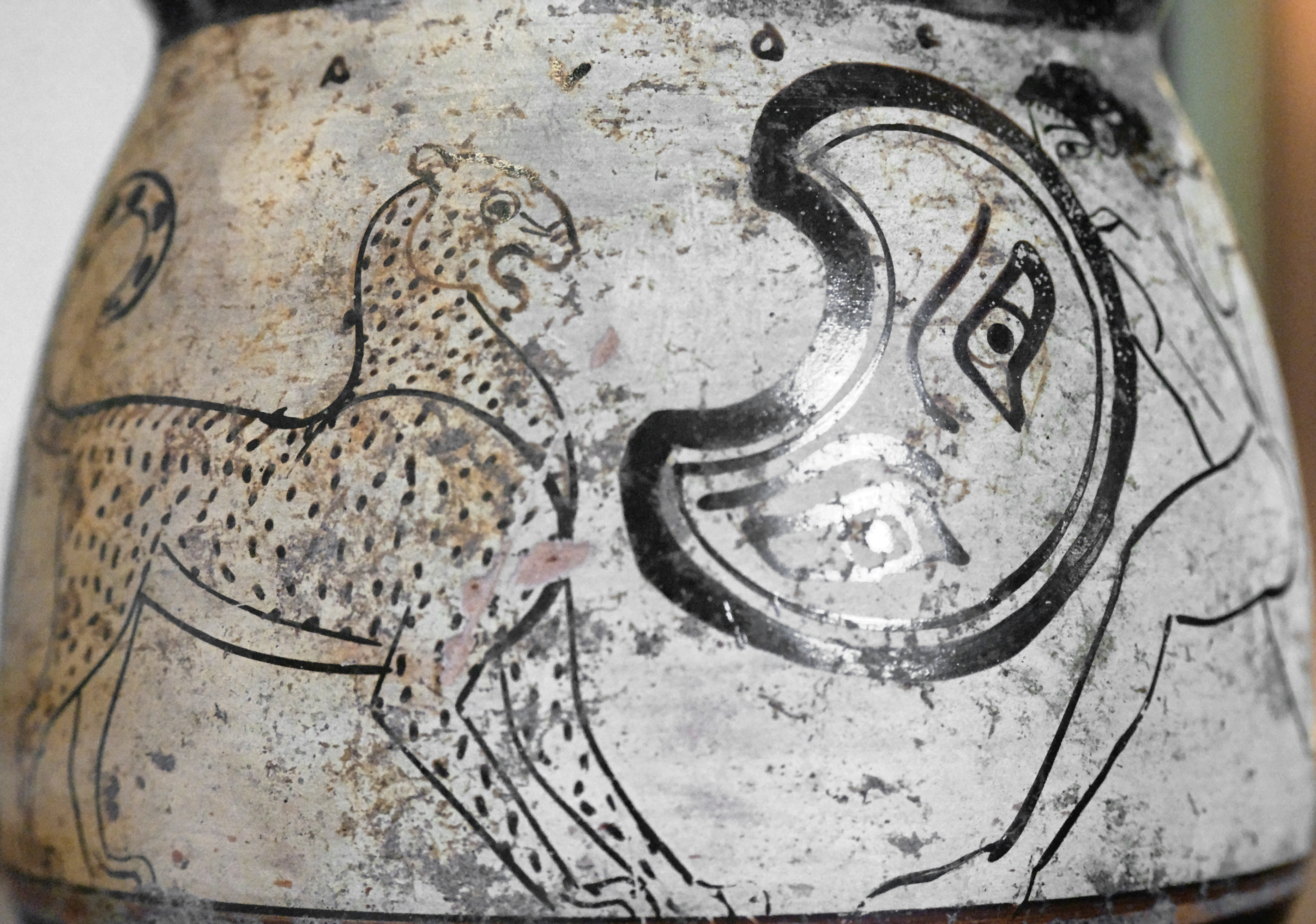
A peltast fighting a panther (from an Attic white-ground mug, 5th century BC)

Peltasts were usually deployed on the flanks of the phalanx, providing a link with any cavalry, or in rough or broken ground. For example, in the Hellenica, Xenophon writes 'When Dercylidas learned this (that a Persian army was nearby), he ordered his officers to form their men in line, eight ranks deep (the hoplite phalanx), as quickly as possible, and to station the peltasts on either wing along with the cavalry.

They could also operate in support of other light troops, such as archers and slingers. In the absence of a large enough cavalry force, or when otherwise deemed appropriate, peltasts would also pursue retreating enemies at the end of a battle, in order to capture or kill men who had thrown away their weapons or been isolated from their formation during the rout.

Peltasts (and other light troops, as ancient sources tend to group all types of light troops together) had a number of essential tasks on the march, away from the battlefield that were difficult to perform for the heavy infantry. They were often used to occupy mountain passes and defensible hills which the army would have to pass, to deny enemy forces a superior attacking position. They would also lay ambushes in wooded or otherwise difficult terrain, defend the rear of the marching army against enemy pursuers, and detachments of light troops would also frequently be used to scout ahead when knowledge of the area and presence of enemies was not well established.

== Tactics ==
When faced with hoplites, peltasts operated by throwing javelins at short range. If the hoplites charged, the peltasts would retreat. As they carried considerably lighter equipment than the hoplites, they were usually able to evade successfully, especially in difficult terrain. They would then return to the attack once the pursuit ended, if possible, taking advantage of any disorder created in the hoplites' ranks. At the Battle of Sphacteria, the Athenian forces included 800 archers and at least 800 peltasts. Thucydides, in the History of the Peloponnesian War, writes

They (the Spartan hoplites) themselves were held up by the weapons shot at them from both flanks by the light troops. Though they (the hoplites) drove back the light troops at any point in which they ran in and approached too closely, they (the light troops) still fought back even in retreat, since they had no heavy equipment and could easily outdistance their pursuers over ground where, since the place had been uninhabited until then, the going was rough and difficult.

When fighting other types of light troops, peltasts were able to close more aggressively in hand-to-hand combat, as they had the advantage of possessing shields, swords, and helmets.

== Medieval Byzantine ==
A type of infantryman called a peltast (peltastēs) is described in the Strategikon, a 6th-century AD military treatise associated with the early Byzantine emperor Maurice. Peltasts were especially prominent in the Byzantine army of the Komnenian period in the late 11th and 12th centuries. Although the peltasts of Antiquity were light skirmish infantry armed with javelins, it is not safe to assume that the troops given this name in the Byzantine period were identical in function. Byzantine peltasts were sometimes described as "assault troops". Byzantine peltasts appear to have been relatively lightly equipped soldiers capable of great battlefield mobility, who could skirmish but who were equally capable of close combat. Their arms may have included a shorter version of the kontarion spear employed by contemporary Byzantine heavy infantry.

== See also ==
- Ancient Macedonian army
- Toxotai
- Velites
- Takabara

== Bibliography ==
Ancient sources

- Diodorus Siculus. History.
- Herodotus.The Histories
- Thucydides. The History of the Peloponnesian War.
- Xenophon. Anabasis.
- Xenophon. Hellenica.

Modern sources

- Best, J. G. P. (1969). Thracian Peltasts and their influence on Greek warfare.
- Birkenmeier, John W. (2002). The Development of the Komnenian Army: 1081–1180. Brill. ISBN 90-04-11710-5.
- Connolly, Peter (1981). Greece and Rome at War. Macdonald (Black Cat, 1988). ISBN 0-7481-0109-8
- Dawson, Timothy (2007). Byzantine Infantryman. Eastern Roman Empire c.900–1204. Osprey. ISBN 978-1-84603-105-2.
- Head, Duncan (1982). Armies of the Macedonian and Punic Wars. WRG.
- Head, Duncan (1992). The Achaemenid Persian Army. Montvert. ISBN 1-874101-00-0
- "Light Infantry", special issue of Ancient Warfare, 2/1 (2008)
- Sekunda, Nicholas V (1988). Achaemenid Military Terminology. In Archaeologische Mitteilungen aus Iran. Band 21.
- Sekunda, Nicholas (1992). The Persian army 560-330 BC. Elite Series. London: Osprey. ISBN 978-1-85532-250-9.
