= Captain America's shield =

Fictional weapon in the Marvel Comics

- The circular design of Captain America's shield: a white five-pointed star on a blue circle surrounded by three concentric rings of red, white, and red.

Publication information
- Publisher: Marvel Comics
- First appearance: Original shield: Captain America Comics #1 (March 1941); Circular shield: Captain America Comics #2 (April 1941)
- Created by: Joe Simon and Jack Kirby

In story information
- Type: Large rotella / flying disc (Proto-Adamantium)
- Element of stories featuring: Captain America; Winter Soldier; Falcon; American Dream

Captain America's shield is a fictional item appearing in American comic books published by Marvel Comics. It is the primary defensive and offensive piece of equipment used by Captain America, and is intended to be an emblem of American culture.

Over the years, Captain America has used several shields of varying composition and design. His original heater shield first appeared in Captain America Comics #1 (March 1941), published by Marvel's 1940s predecessor, Timely Comics. The circular shield best associated with the character debuted in the next issue, Captain America Comics #2.

== Original shield ==
New York Comic Art Convention program with Joe Simon's original 1940 sketch of Captain America

In his debut, Captain America was equipped with a heater-style shield made from steel. After complaints by rival comic-book publisher MLJ that the design was too similar to that of its own patriotic hero the Shield, Timely Comics replaced the triangular shield with a disc-shaped one.

While the origin and fate of the original shield were not described in the original comics from the 1940s, the shield's fate was revealed decades later in 2001 through a retconned story. T'Chaka, king of Wakanda, met Captain America in early 1941 and gave him a sample of vibranium. The vibranium was used to make Captain America's circular shield, and his triangular one was retired.

In the 2010 limited series Captain America/Black Panther: Flags of Our Fathers, Captain America, Nick Fury and the Howling Commandos meet Azzari (grandfather of T'Challa)—the Black Panther and king of Wakanda during World War II. Aided by Wakandan military forces, they repel a series of attacks by the Red Skull and Baron Strucker. During the battle, the Red Skull crushes the triangular shield, and Captain America uses a circular vibranium shield provided by T'Challa to incapacitate Red Skull. The weapon served as the inspiration for Captain America's later circular shield.

A second triangular shield was kept at Avengers Mansion. It is destroyed by Mr. Hyde during a raid on the mansion by Baron Zemo's Masters of Evil, but is later restored by Zemo. The shield is eventually given to and used by Eli Bradley. A third triangular shield is kept in the Smithsonian Institution until it is destroyed by Bron-Char.

== Circular shield ==
Captain America (vol. 5) #5 (May 2005). Cover art by Steve Epting

The round shield most associated with Captain America made its debut in Captain America Comics #2 (April 1941). A near-indestructible concavo-convex metal disc approximately 2.5 feet (0.76 m) in diameter, weighing 12 pounds (5.4 kg), it has remained Captain America's most constant shield over the decades.

In Captain America #255 (March 1981), it is established that the shield was presented to Captain America by President Franklin D. Roosevelt. The shield is created by metallurgist Myron MacLain, who had been commissioned by the US government to create an indestructible armor material to aid the war effort. MacLain experiments with vibranium. During one of his experiments to fuse vibranium with an experimental steel alloy, MacLain falls asleep and awakens to find that his experiments have created a metal alloy. MacLain attempts to recreate the shield's metal to no avail, with his experiments instead creating adamantium.

Captain America's shield is more durable than regular adamantium and is essentially indestructible. The vibranium grants the shield unusual properties, allowing it to absorb kinetic impact and vibrations without harm.

Soon after his revival from suspended animation and rescue by the Avengers, Captain America briefly experimented with Stark's modification of the shield which included a magnetic mechanism that enabled Captain America to hold the shield through a corresponding magnetic mechanism attached to his left glove, as well as communications equipment. These modifications allowed Captain America to launch the shield from his glove and control it mid-flight. Captain America decided to have those modifications removed and restored the holding straps since he found that he preferred to physically throw the shield himself and the electronic equipment hindered the shield's balance.

After Captain America is killed, S.H.I.E.L.D. takes over custody of the shield, with one replica on display in a museum and another replica buried alongside Captain America. The shield is subsequently stolen by Bucky Barnes, who does not want anyone else to carry the shield. At Iron Man's insistence, Barnes uses the shield as the new Captain America. Barnes attempts to return the shield to Steve Rogers after his resurrection, but is told to keep it. Rogers reclaims the shield after Barnes is apparently killed during the Fear Itself storyline.

=== Destruction of the shield ===
The Serpent breaks Captain America's shield in Fear Itself #5 (October 2011). Art by Stuart Immonen, Wade Von Grawbadger, and Laura Martin.

Over time the shield has been damaged or destroyed several times within the confines of the Earth-616 continuity:

- In The Avengers #215–216, the Molecule Man disintegrates the shield, along with Thor's hammer, Iron Man's armor, and the Silver Surfer's board. He later reassembles these items, with the exception of the armor, as the electronic circuits are too complicated for him to understand.
- During the 1984-1985 Secret Wars limited series, the shield is partially destroyed by Doctor Doom, who has stolen the power of the Beyonder. When the Beyonder reclaims his power, the heroes are temporarily granted the ability to realize their wishes. Rogers uses this to reconstruct his shield.
- During the 1991 miniseries The Infinity Gauntlet, Thanos shatters the shield with a blow of his fist while in combat with Captain America. The shield is soon restored by Nebula when she obtains the Infinity Gauntlet and uses it to undo the events of Thanos's temporary godhood, resulting in her erasing the death and destruction that Thanos had caused over the previous 24 hours.
- Due to a stray molecule being out of place when Captain America reconstructed the shield using the Beyonder's residual power, a vibranium "cancer" was introduced to the shield, spreading with each subsequent impact until it finally shattered. When Klaw strikes the shield during a battle with Captain America, he inadvertently realigns the shield's molecules, destroying the cancer.
- During the 2011 miniseries Fear Itself, the Serpent destroys Captain America's shield. The shield is repaired by Iron Man and Asgardian dwarves, who enhance it with uru metal.

== Other shields ==
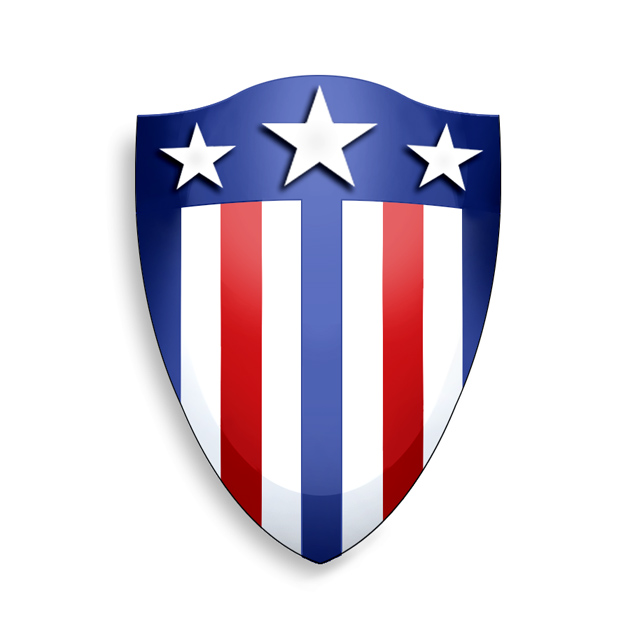
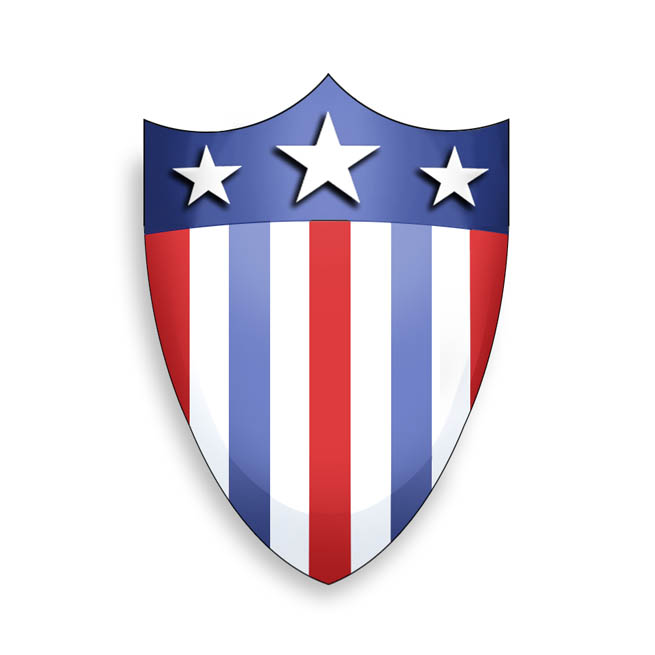
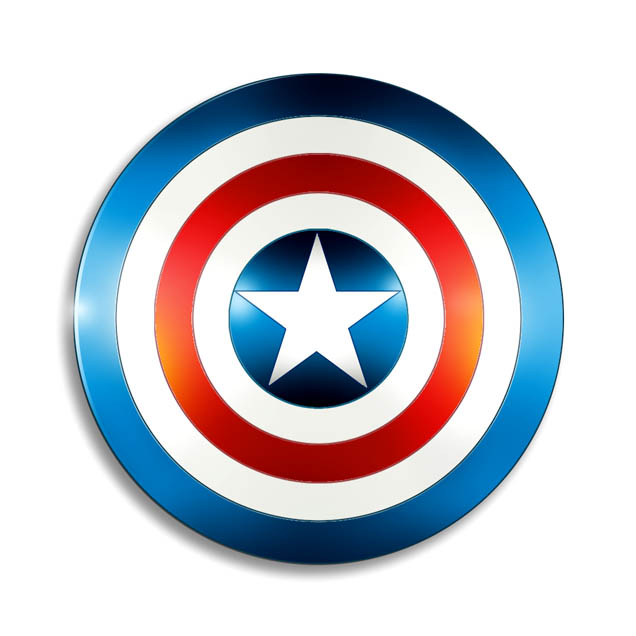
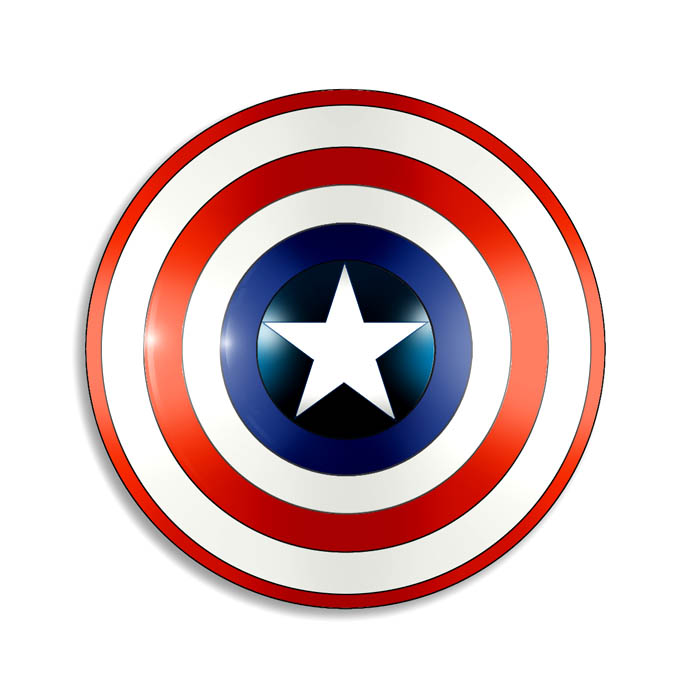
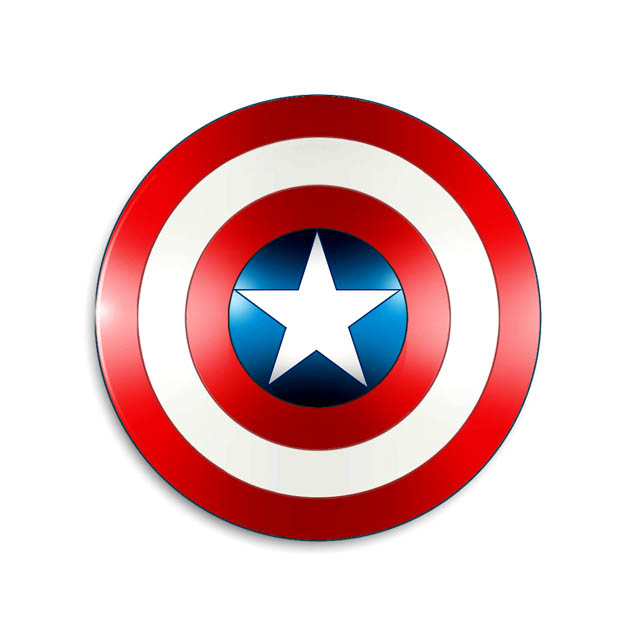
Variants of Captain America's shield, 1941-1964
- While Steve Rogers was asleep in suspended animation, three other men used the identity of Captain America, all using steel replicas of the discus shield. The 1950s Captain America was placed in suspended animation after becoming mentally unstable. By the time he was revived years later, Rogers had returned. When the two clashed, in the 1950s Captain America's shield was broken.
- In the 1980s, in a story written by Mark Gruenwald, Rogers chose to resign the mantle of Captain America, rather than submit to the orders of the United States government and took the alias as "The Captain" instead. During this period, the role of Captain America was assumed by John Walker, the former Super-Patriot, who used both the costume and the indestructible shield. In his new identity of "The Captain", Rogers initially used a pure adamantium shield provided by Tony Stark, but a falling out between the two as a result of the "Armor Wars" storyline led Rogers to return it. He then began to use a pure vibranium shield provided by the Black Panther. When Rogers returned to his Captain America identity, Walker became the U.S. Agent and returned the original shield to him. Walker would go on to have his own array of different shields over the years, the first of which appeared to be the last vibranium shield Rogers was using as the Captain.
- At one point, when Rogers was exiled from the United States and was briefly unable to use his shield, Sharon Carter provided him with a photonic energy shield designed to mimic a vibranium matrix.
- During the time when the shield was lost in the Atlantic, Rogers tried using a pure adamantium shield, but was unable to get used to the balance. He also tried fighting without a shield but also found it awkward.
- Sharon Carter next provided him with another photonic shield, but one whose shape could be controlled to morph the energy field into a wider force field, a bo staff or even fire a projection of the shield. While he enjoyed the versatility, Rogers noticed a number of drawbacks, particularly its inability to ricochet. Rogers gave one of the energy shield gloves to a freedom fighter in an oppressive future he traveled to and received a replacement from S.H.I.E.L.D. when he got back to his own time.
- In Secret Avengers, he uses a new energy shield which could be generated on either arm, or both, and was able to be thrown and ricochet off surfaces to hit targets before it dissipates, preventing enemies from using it against him. A new shield would be generated moments later. Moon Knight, who had acquired a copy of the technology, had it described to him as a "zero point energy shield".
- In Captain America: Steve Rogers, Steve wields a new version of the triangular shield that can deploy an energy blade on its pointy end and can be divided in two, allowing him to use both halves in combat.
- On Earth-691, Vance Astro wielded the shield for a time as Major Victory.

== Marvel Cinematic Universe version ==
Captain America's shield
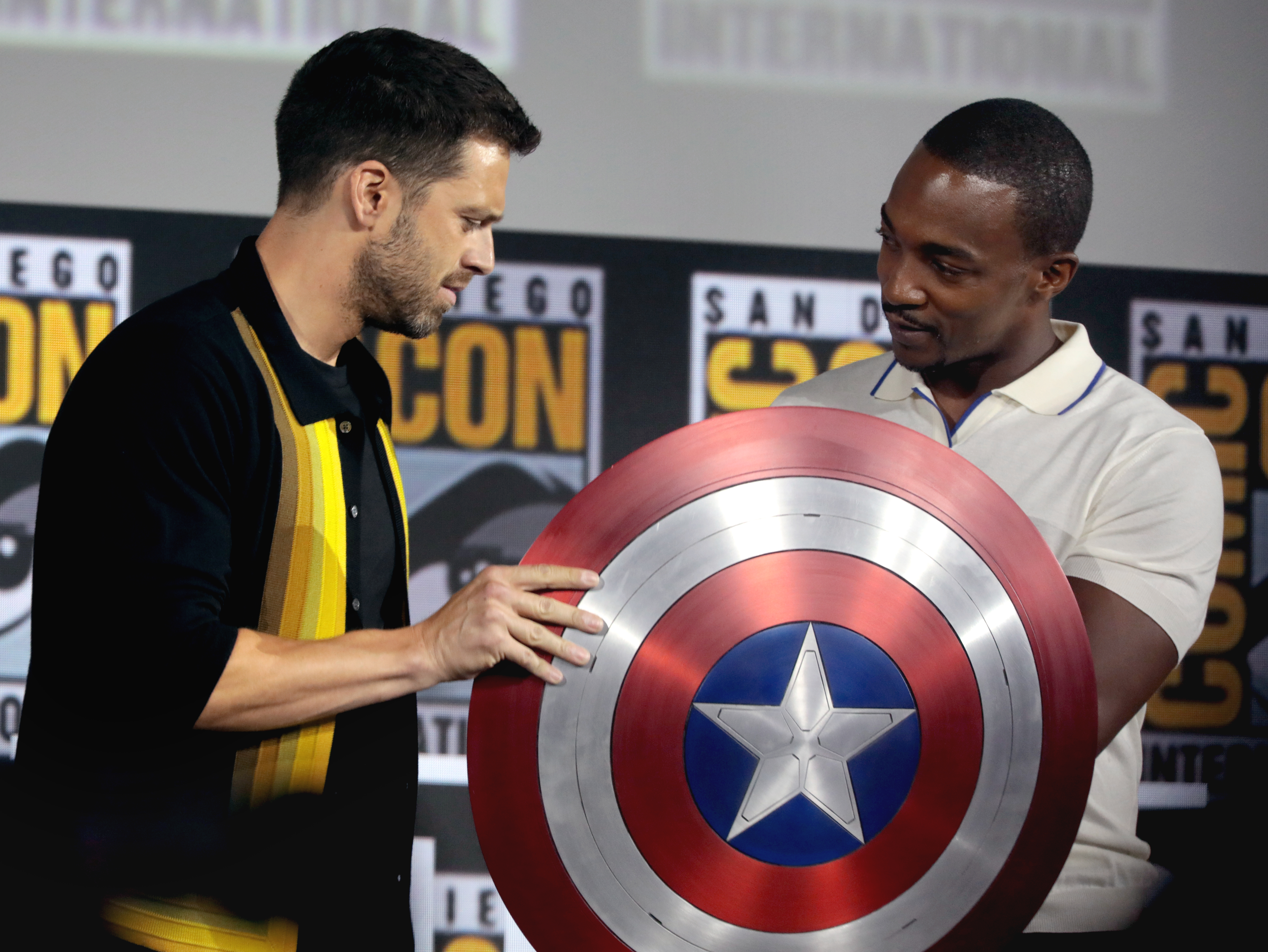
- The shield, as depicted in the Marvel Cinematic Universe, being held by Anthony Mackie and Sebastian Stan at the 2019 San Diego Comic-Con
- First appearance: Captain America: The First Avenger (2011)
- Based on: Captain America's shield by: Joe Simon; Jack Kirby
- Adapted by: Christopher Markus Stephen McFeely

In-universe information
- Creator: Howard Stark
- Used by: Steve Rogers; Bucky Barnes; John Walker; Sam Wilson; Peggy Carter (as Captain Carter)
- Made of: Vibranium

Captain America's shield is a recurring item throughout the Marvel Cinematic Universe franchise. This version of the shield was created by Howard Stark and given to Steve Rogers during World War II. Within the MCU, the shield is seen as a symbol of Captain America's strength and legacy.

=== Appearances ===
- In Iron Man (2008), a partially completed replica of the shield appears when Pepper Potts watches Tony Stark trying to remove his damaged armor. Stark uses the alloy of a prototype made by his father to create his Iron Man armor.
- In Iron Man 2 (2010), Stark's replica of the shield is noticed by Phil Coulson and it is subsequently used to hold the apparatus that allows Stark to discover a new element.
- In Captain America: The First Avenger (2011), Steve Rogers uses an ornamental version of the triangular shield during World War II on a musical tour with the USO promoting war bonds. He then uses that shield in his first combat mission. It is rendered useless after Johann Schmidt punches a large dent in it. He later notices an unadorned circular shield among Howard Stark's proposed weapons, which Stark says is made of a rare metal called Vibranium that is much stronger and one-third the weight of steel. Although Stark says it is a prototype, Rogers decides to use it after it stops .45 caliber bullets shot at it by Peggy Carter. It is painted in the familiar red, white and blue pattern modeled after the colors of the American flag. Rogers uses the shield throughout the war. It protects Rogers from not only standard weapons, but also the energy-based weapons Hydra uses that are powered by the Tesseract. Rogers also uses the shield as an offensive weapon and becomes highly skilled in accurately throwing, deflecting, and retrieving it. Rogers has the shield with him when he is frozen in 1945. In 2011, Rogers and the shield are discovered by S.H.I.E.L.D. agents in the Arctic within a crashed, frozen aircraft.
- In The Avengers (2012), Rogers uses the shield while fighting against Loki and is able to deflect an energy blast from his Mind Stone-powered scepter. The shield also guards Rogers from Thor's hammer Mjolnir, and the subsequent shockwave created when the two weapons collide causes both Thor and Rogers to fall to the ground and decimate nearby foliage. He also uses the shield during the battle against the Chitauri, and Stark deflects his energy beams off it to amplify their power.
- In Iron Man 3 (2013), Trevor Slattery is seen with a tattoo depicting the shield on the back of his neck.
- In Thor: The Dark World (2013), Loki's illusion impersonating Rogers also depicts a recreation of his shield.
- In Captain America: The Winter Soldier (2014), Rogers uses his shield while fighting against Georges Batroc and his men. It protects both him and Natasha Romanoff from a high powered explosive. He later uses it to crash through walls in an office building while chasing the Winter Soldier. When Rogers throws it at the Winter Soldier, he uses his metal arm to catch and throw the shield back, much to Rogers' surprise. Rogers uses the shield to absorb some of the impact after he jumps from the Triskelion building and lands unharmed hundreds of feet below. He also uses it to take down a Quinjet and it protects him and Romanoff against a ballistic missile. He later uses it in confrontations against the Winter Soldier, where it counters the latter's metal arm and also takes a direct hit from a grenade launcher without damage.
- In Avengers: Age of Ultron (2015), the handles of the shield are outfitted with magnetic elements, allowing Rogers to better control the shield and call it back to his gauntlets. Rogers throws and calls it back to him while riding his motorcycle into battle. He and Thor combine the shield and Mjolnir to create massive shockwaves capable of destroying Hydra tanks. During Ultron's initial attack, Clint Barton accurately throws the shield to Rogers who uses it to completely obliterate an Ultron sentry. He continues to use it in combat throughout against Ultron, his sentries, and Pietro Maximoff, the latter of which he knocks unconscious with it. Ultron laments that the shield, which he calls a "frisbee", is an example of human foolishness given the versatility of the vibranium it is made of. During his confrontation with Ultron, Rogers loses the shield when it falls off a truck but it is retrieved by Romanoff and returned to Rogers. The shield guards against and reflects Ultron's energy beams and pierces Ultron's shoulder when Rogers kicks it at him. He later throws the shield to Romanoff during the Battle of Sokovia, and she uses it to defend herself against Ultron's sentries.
- In Captain America: Civil War (2016), Rogers uses the shield throughout. During his fight with Brock Rumlow, he throws the shield high into the air to protect himself and nearby civilians after an explosive device is thrown and sticks to it. He uses the shield as he attempts to protect Barnes from law enforcement in Bucharest. When he confronts T'Challa, the shield is scratched by T'Challa's vibranium claws. The United Nations seizes the shield temporarily until it is stolen and returned to Rogers by Sharon Carter. Later, the shield is temporarily stolen by Peter Parker but quickly returned to Rogers by Scott Lang. He uses the shield in confrontations with Parker, T'Challa, James Rhodes, and Stark. Barnes uses the shield to attack Rhodes and Stark as well. During his final confrontation with Stark, Rogers uses it to disable some of his armor's flight capability, deflect Stark's energy beams, and finally in combination with Barnes to overwhelm Stark. After he uses the shield to destroy Stark's arc reactor and disable the Iron Man armor. As Rogers leaves with Bucky, Stark calls out that his father, Howard, made the shield for Rogers and that he does not deserve it. Rogers' only response is to leave the shield with Stark.
- In Spider-Man: Homecoming (2017), video footage captured by Spider-Man during the events of the Civil War, depicting the title character stealing the shield from Rogers, is shown.
- In Avengers: Endgame (2019), Stark returns the shield to Rogers as a gesture of reconciliation between them. Rogers takes the shield with him when he time travels via the Quantum Realm to an alternate 2012, where he faces an alternate version of himself who mistakes him for Loki in disguise, leading to the two versions using their shields to fight each other. Later, during the battle against an alternate Thanos, Rogers proves worthy of using Thor's hammer Mjolnir, and combines Mjolnir with his shield for combination attacks. However, the shield is fractured by Thanos' double-sided blade, with a fractured third of it being broken off by Thanos's attack. Just before going to confront Thanos alone, Rogers uses the shield's strap to set his injured arm. Following the Avengers' victory, an elderly Rogers, returning from an alternate timeline, bequeaths a new alternate shield, now fully repaired and with a slight design change to the star in the center, to Sam Wilson.
- In The Falcon and the Winter Soldier (2021), Wilson gives the alternate new shield to the US government to be placed in the Smithsonian museum exhibit dedicated to Rogers. The government then gives the shield to John Walker, who they name the new Captain America. Walker uses the shield in combat throughout the series and proves proficient in using it. Karli Morgenthau, leader of the Flag Smashers, calls the shield a "symbol of a bygone era" and believes it should be destroyed. During a confrontation with the Dora Milaje, Walker briefly loses the shield which is handled with expertise by one of the warriors, although Ayo orders it returned to Walker. After Walker injects himself with the Super Soldier Serum and witnesses his partner Lemar Hoskins killed by Morgenthau, he murders another Flag Smasher with the shield while a horrified crowd watches and records him, and with the shield partially bloodstained. Following this, the shield is recovered by Wilson and Barnes, and Wilson trains in becoming proficient with it. Wilson, taking on the Captain America mantle, uses the shield to defeat the Flag Smashers.
- In Eternals (2021), the triangular shield used by Rogers in his USO shows is shown to be in the possession of Kingo.
- Alternate versions of the shield appeared in the animated series What If...?.
  - An alternate version of the shield is used by Peggy Carter in "What If... Captain Carter Were the First Avenger?". After she is enhanced by the Super Soldier Serum and becomes Captain Carter, Howard Stark gifts her the shield with a United Kingdom-style design as opposed to the original American one. She uses the shield in combat throughout the episode.
  - An alternate version of the shield appears in "What If... T'Challa Became a Star-Lord?" as part of the Collector's collection on Knowhere.
- In Spider-Man: No Way Home (2021), the Statue of Liberty is shown undergoing construction to add the shield to its design. The shield add-on is damaged during Peter Parker's battle with Norman Osborn.
- An alternate version of the shield appears in Doctor Strange in the Multiverse of Madness (2022), used by Captain Carter in an alternate reality called Earth-838. The shield appears identical to the one used by the other Captain Carter in What If...?. Carter uses the shield to battle Wanda Maximoff. However, she is killed when Wanda bisects her with the shield.

=== Concept and development ===
In production for Captain America: The First Avenger, the shield, which is depicted as both a defensive tool and a weapon, came in four types: metal, fiberglass, rubber, and computer graphics (CG). Prop master Barry Gibbs specified that "We had the 'hero shield,' which was made of aluminum, for our beauty shots [and] close-up work. We then created a lighter shield that was aluminum-faced with fiberglass back, for use on a daily basis. ... And then we had a stunt shield made of polyurethane, which is sort of a synthetic rubber ... and we made an ultrasoft one we put on [Evans'] back, so that if there were an accident, it wouldn't hurt him." Visual effects supervisor Christopher Townsend said Evans "would practice swinging the practical shield so he knew the arc and the speed at which he should move. We would take the shield from him and shoot the scene with him miming it. Then we would add in a CG shield".

The premise of The Falcon and the Winter Soldier revolves around a moment in the film Avengers: Endgame (2019) which depicts Steve Rogers bequeathing the shield and the mantle of Captain America to his friend Sam Wilson. Marvel Studios chief executive Kevin Feige said this was intended to be a "classic passing of the torch from one hero to another", but when Marvel Studios got the opportunity to make television series for Disney+ they decided to expand this into an entire story about Wilson becoming Captain America, with the shield serving as a symbol for the superhero title. Mackie said the series would explore Wilson's backstory and treat him as a "regular guy" in a world of superheroes, while "walk[ing] the line of who is going to take up the [Captain America] shield" after Endgame.

== Other versions ==
- In the 1998-1999 time travel mini-series Avengers Forever, various future and alternate versions of Captain America are shown with many different variations of the shield.
- In the Marvel manga stories, Captain America uses a photonic shield before his death in Volumes 1 and 2, and his bodyguards use shields of metal. The shield also appears in the Rings of Fate mini-series, having been acquired by Carol Danvers after Elektra stole it from Avengers Mansion when she uses the costume of Captain America.
- Captain Mexica is an alternate world version of Captain America from a universe where the Aztec Empire never fell. His shield is used by Machine Man as a weapon during a zombie incursion; Mexica himself is killed.
- Ultimate Captain America uses a shield of pure Vibranium, although that metal may not possess the same properties in the Ultimate Marvel universe as it does in the mainstream Marvel Universe. The shield was destroyed when Gregory Stark smashed it with Thor's hammer, though Captain America would wield another later.
  - In Ultimate Nightmare, the Ultimate Marvel version of Captain America encounters his Russian counterpart, who has been driven mad due to being trapped in an underground complex for many years. He has created a "replica" of the shield, which turns out to be made out of scrap metal and human remains and grafted directly onto his forearm, and which proves far less powerful than Captain America's own shield.

== In other media ==
=== Television ===
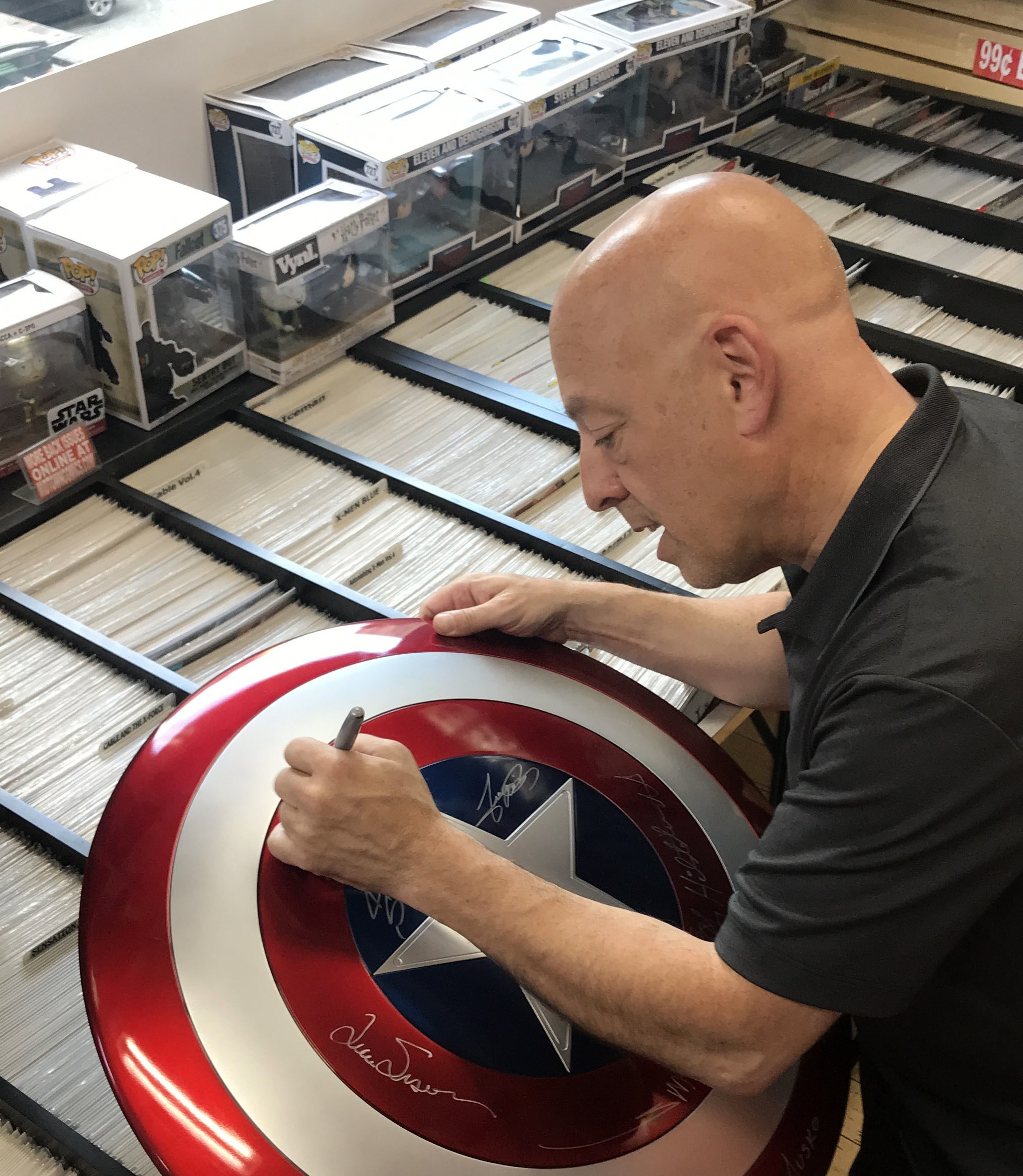
Writer Brian Michael Bendis signing a fan's replica of the shield at Midtown Comics in Manhattan

- In the 1970s Captain America TV movies, Steve Rogers is given a transparent plexiglass shield painted with concentric stripes (red and clear transparent) and a central star. The shield was designed to act as the windscreen for his motorcycle, but could be detached and used in its traditional offensive / defensive role when Rogers goes on foot. Furthermore, the shield can apparently return to Rogers in a smooth arc when thrown without needing to be ricocheted and with enough force to knock a man down in the return path.
- In 2003, the company Factory X released a line of licensed prop replicas of items from the Marvel Universe. An aluminum replica of Captain America's shield was among their initial line up of props, and was limited to a production of 2,525 pieces.
- In the closing of the March 12, 2007 episode of The Colbert Report, Stephen Colbert read a letter from Joe Quesada in response to Colbert's earlier comments toward Captain America. He was then presented with what was said to be Captain America's indestructible shield, reportedly willed to Colbert in the event of Cap's "death". The shield was originally credited to be one of the Factory X replicas, but this is not the case. The shield given to Colbert was originally acquired by the long-time writer and editor (and late) Mark Gruenwald, who either commissioned it or received it as a gift. It eventually found its way into the hands of Marvel editor Tom Brevoort, and was kept in his office until being passed on to Colbert. In a pre-show conversation with a studio audience, Colbert, speaking out of character, said that when his wife saw the shield and the accompanying note, she started crying. He confessed he was bemused by her reaction to a fictional character sending a prop shield to a fictional version of himself. The shield was put on display hanging on the wall along with other trophies on The Colbert Report set for every episode afterwards. After The Colbert Report ended, the shield was moved to the set of Colbert's next talk show, The Late Show with Stephen Colbert where it has been on display since.
- In the Avengers: Earth's Mightiest Heroes episode "A Day Unlike Any Other", Loki uses his magic to shatter Captain America's shield while taunting him. In the episode "Behold... The Vision!", Captain America's shield is restored by the Black Panther and scientists in Wakanda using a vibranium machine that fuses the pieces back together.
- The adamantium-vibranium alloy version of the shield appears in Ultimate Spider-Man.

=== Film ===
- In the 1990 live-action film Captain America, Steve Rogers/Captain America uses a metal shield of similar design.
- In the animated film Ultimate Avengers, based loosely on The Ultimates, Captain America uses a shield made from vibranium and adamantium. Captain America received the shield while it was still a prototype. With this new shield, he fought against the Chitauri alongside the Avengers. Before then, he used a triangular shield that he was fond of. The composition of the triangular shield remains unrevealed. It did prove to be effective against the bullets of German soldiers, but was not of practical use when he could use much more advanced technology.
- In the 2021 action comedy Free Guy, which takes place in a video m-game world, Ryan Reynolds' character produces the Marvel Studios version of the shield and uses it to defend himself, at which point the Avengers theme is heard. Chris Evans makes a cameo appearance as himself acknowledging the connection. This moment was added to the script shortly before shooting after 20th Century Fox, the studio producing the film, was acquired by Disney.

== Impact ==
Flag used by USS America

The shield has been used as a promotional symbol associated with the Marvel Cinematic Universe. A model of the shield was sent as a gift by Chris Evans, who plays the role of Steve Rogers in the Marvel Cinematic Universe, to a 6-year-old boy who had sustained injuries when defending his sister from a dog attack. Before the premiere of The Falcon and the Winter Soldier, an image of the shield was projected onto landmarks such as the London Eye and the Singapore Flyer. Students at the Massachusetts Institute of Technology, meanwhile, also paid homage to the shield by covering the university's 'Great Dome' with a design of the shield, drawing approval from Chris Evans on Twitter. The shield has also been included by Epic Games as an in-game accessory in the popular video game Fortnite.

A model of the shield was also held in a swearing-in by San Jose, California Republican councilman Lan Diep, with various speculation that the shield was a metaphor to symbolise opposition to Republican President Donald Trump. The use of the shield as a symbol of American nationalism by Trump supporters in the 2021 storming of the United States Capitol, meanwhile, drew criticism from Neal Kirby, the son of the shield's comics creator, Jack Kirby, who said that the shield symbolized "the absolute antithesis of Donald Trump".

The crew of the USS America adopted Captain America's shield as an official battle flag.

In Chile, the shield also represents the right-wing political party Republican Party (Partido Republicano). One of those politicians who uses the shield is José Antonio Kast, who used the shield back in 2019.
