= Temple Pyx =

12th century bronze

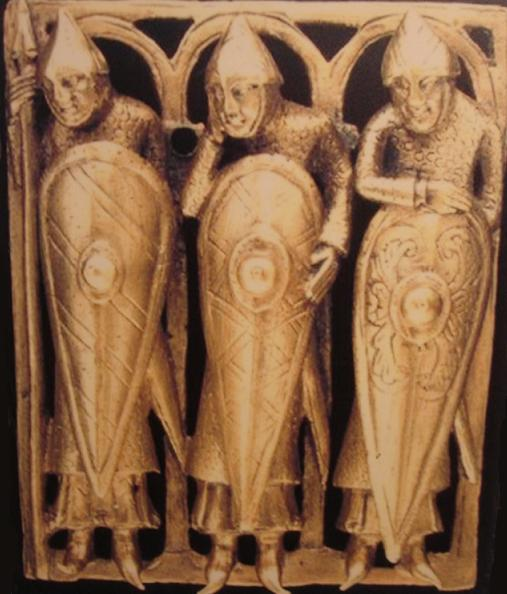
- Artist: German, possibly English
- Year: c. 1125-50 A.D.
- Medium: Bronze, Copper Alloy
- Dimensions: 9.2 x 7.3 cm (3.6 x 2.9 in)
- Location: Burrell Collection, Glasgow Museum

The Temple Pyx is a mid 12th century medieval bronze gilt plaque, suggested as German in origin (although it was discovered in the Temple Church in London). It is currently a part of the Burrell Collection in Glasgow, Scotland.

It is a beautiful example of High Medieval metalwork and gives excellent detail of the arms, armour and architecture of the Norman period. It features three Romanesque arches above each soldier.

The soldiers all wield swords and spears, conical nasal helms, teardrop kite shields with center boss, shin length maille hauberks, shoulder to foot tunics (no doubt shorter gambesons sandwiched in between) and pointed shoes. This suggests that the estimated date of 1150 is incorrect as by the 12th century kite shields already began to lose their rounded tops and bosses (but not entirely until the 13th century), maille hauberks shortened to knee or thigh length and helmets soon evolved into kalotas (early great helm) by losing their conical tops and eventually harnessing faceplates instead of noseguards.

It is assumed these figures represent part of the Holy Sepulchre; these soldiers stood guard asleep and with backs turned to the resurrection. Another theory is these are King Herod's soldiers, who didn't realize St Peter was escaping from prison. Despite being found in the Temple Church, it doesn't necessarily have religious significance, but it is assumed that it was a shrine decoration.

== The Wallace Collection ==
BBC's 'A History of the World' regarding the Temple Pyx mentions that "Several similar pieces are recorded, and it seems likely that they all originally formed part of a shrine". The Wallace Collection of London hosts a matching piece in bronze of a lone Norman soldier. The likeness of this figure resembles the Temple Pyx so closely it is most likely made by the same person.
