= Takabara =

Persian army unit

Takabara was a unit in the Persian Achaemenid army. They appear in some references related to the Greco-Persian wars, but little is known about them. According to Greek sources they were a tough type of peltasts. Takabara nevertheless were more garrison warriors than front line fighters as proved against the well-armed Hoplites of Greece where they were easily defeated in hand to hand conflict. They tended to fight with their own native weapons which would have included a crescent-shaped light wickerwork shield and a type of light-axe called the Sagaris as well as light linen cloth and leather. The Takabara were recruited from territories that incorporated modern Iraq and parts of Iran.
