= Prince Charlie's Targe =

Elaborate shield made during the 1745 Jacobite Rising

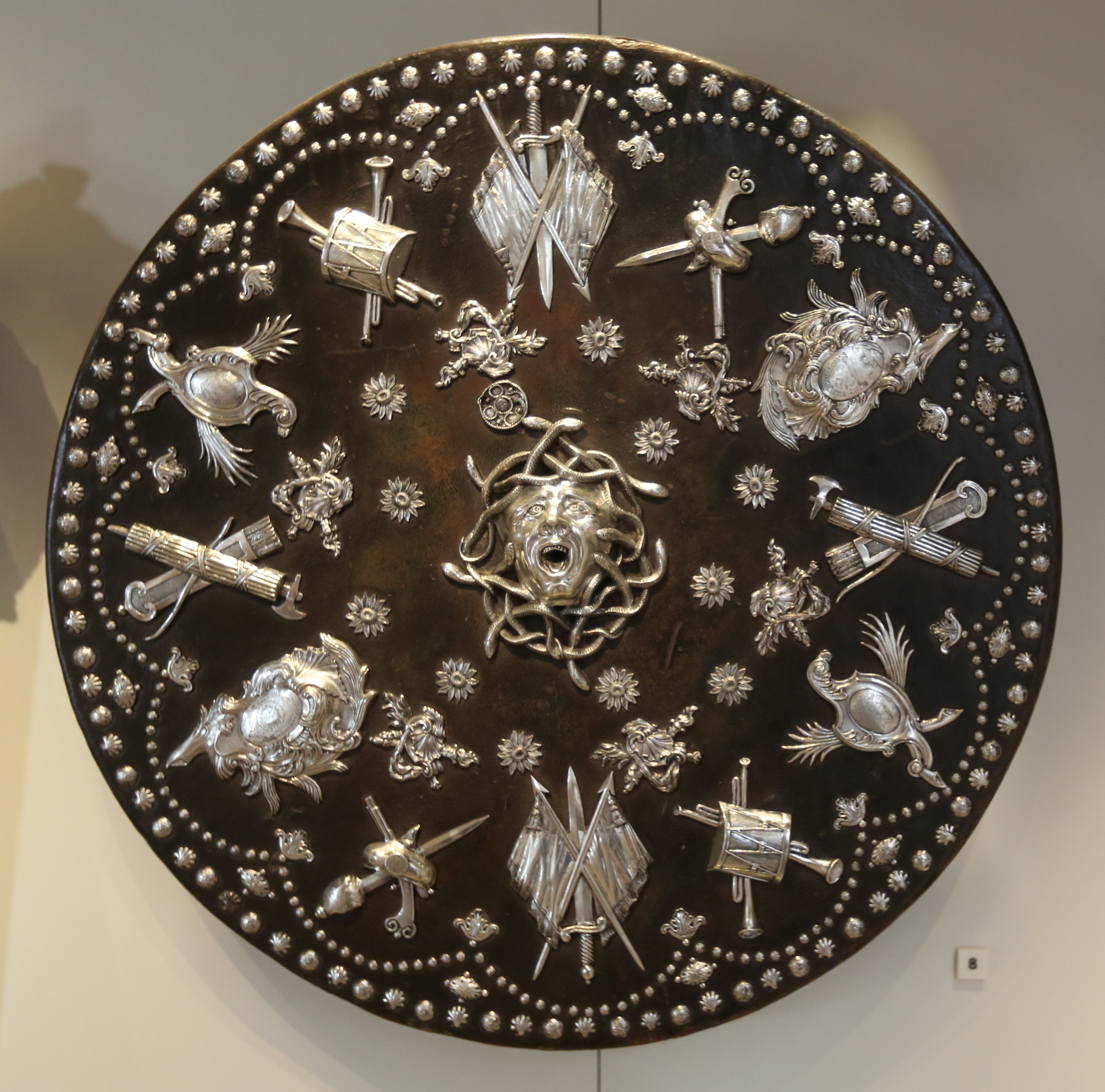
Charles Edward Stuart's highly decorated targe on display at the National Museum of Scotland

Prince Charlie's Targe is a notable 18th-century targe, a type of shield. The most prominent example is a highly decorated targe in the National Museum of Scotland. The silver decorations include Medusa's head in the centre and various arms and crests around the edge. The initial targe was presented to Charles by James Drummond, 3rd Duke of Perth circa 1740. The targe is said to have been recovered by government forces following the Battle of Culloden and was later presented to the Duke of Cumberland. In 2016, the targe was exhibited at Perth Museum.

This targe is said to have been one of thirteen made for Prince Charles Edward Stuart, also known as "Bonnie Prince Charlie" or the "Young Pretender". It is stated that Charles gave them away as trophies to his supporters during the 1745 Jacobite rising. The shield measures just 20 inches across. It is made out of tooled leather stretched across a wooden frame. One of these targes can be seen in Warwick Castle and is thought to be the only one in England.
