= Shield boss =

Piece of material at a shield's centre

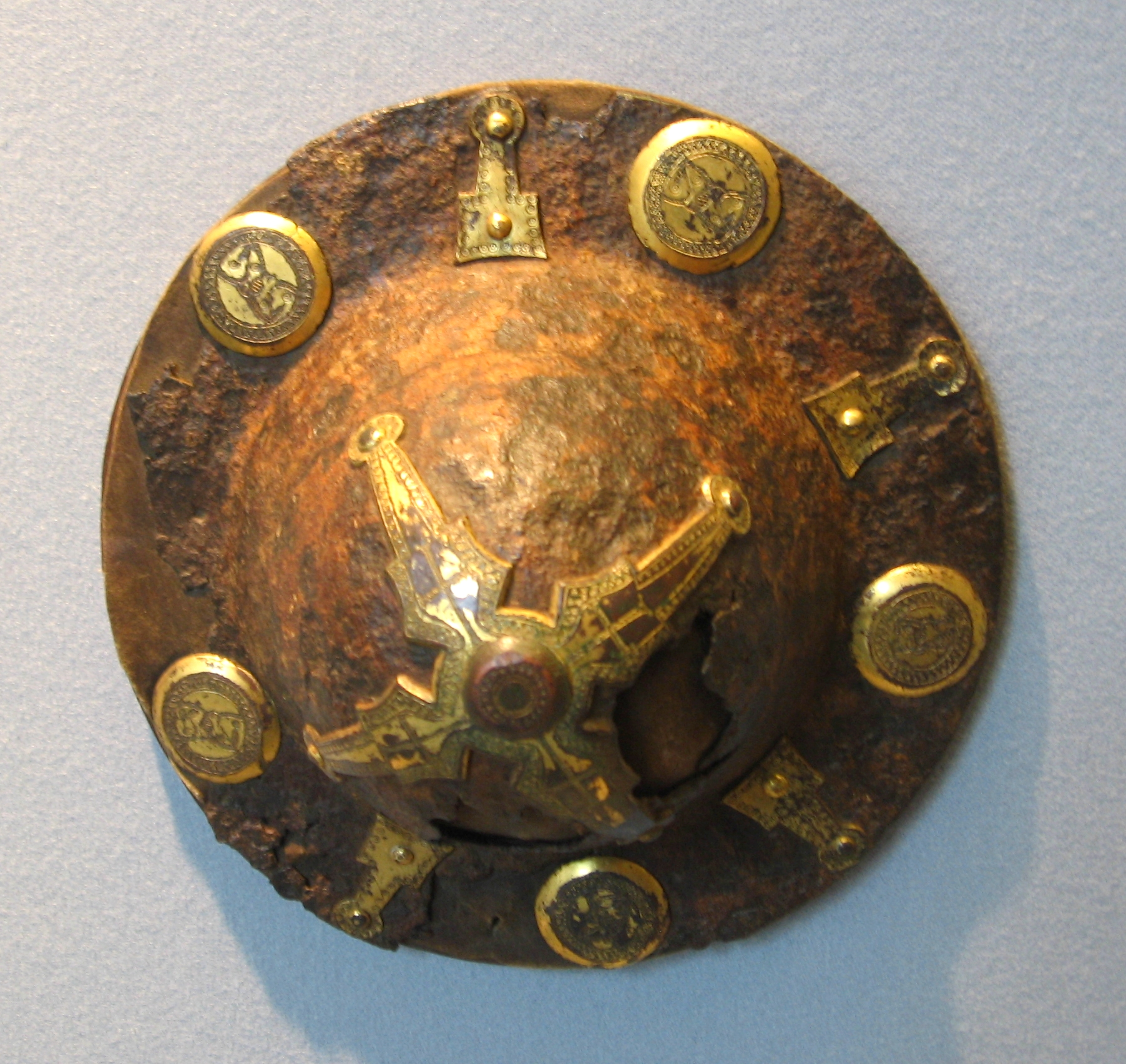
A Lombard shield boss from northern Italy, 7th century (Metropolitan Museum of Art)

A shield boss, or umbo (/ˈʌm.boʊ/), is a round, convex or conical piece of material at the centre of a shield. Shield bosses (or sometimes, just "bosses") are usually made of thick metal but may also be made of wood. The boss originally served to deflect blows from the centre of round shields, though it also provided a place to mount the shield's grip. As time went on and heater shields with curved bodies became more popular, and enarmes superseded the bar grip, the boss became more of an ornamental piece.

Often, bosses are not present on non-circular shields due to the differences in technique; with a round shield, one makes a punching motion towards an oncoming blow, while with a heater or kite shield, attacks are blocked by pivoting the shield about the body. A boss provides a significant advantage for deflecting blows when using a punching motion, but is not very effective when using a pivot to block an attack.

== Manufacture ==
First found in prehistoric bronze, in medieval times, shield bosses were made by armourers out of sheets of iron or steel. The armourer started with a flat, relatively thin sheet and sank the metal into a bowl, which might then be planished and polished.

== See also ==
- Phalera (harness)
