= Round shield =

Hand-held protective device

A round shield can refer to any type of hand-held shield that has a round shape. They come in highly varying sizes, and have, in different forms, been very popular in Europe, the Asia and the Americas, throughout the Bronze Age, the classical period, the post-classical period, and the early modern period. During the Bronze Age they were generally large and designed for bashing and shield wall tactics (such as Spartan bronze shields), while since the late post-classical they were mostly designed for parrying and riposte (such as the small buckler, supplanted by the heater shield).

At the end of the period of Mycenaean Greece round shields with a central grip were the most commonly used shields in the area.

Although offering less protection, especially to the legs than the kite shield, the round shield was sometimes used as an offensive weapon. The word "swashbuckler" came from this, as soldiers beat their weapon against the buckler.

== List of round shields ==
Eric XIV of Sweden's shield made of steel 1562. Decorated with warring Amazons.

- aspis
- buckler
- clipeus
- dhal
- parma
- taming
- targe
- Mayan and Aztec shield
- viking shield
- yetholm-type shield

== See also ==
- Captain America's shield
