= Heater shield =

Form of European medieval shield whose shape resembles that of a clothes iron

Geometrical construction of the Reuleaux triangle style of heater shield, for use as an heraldic escutcheon

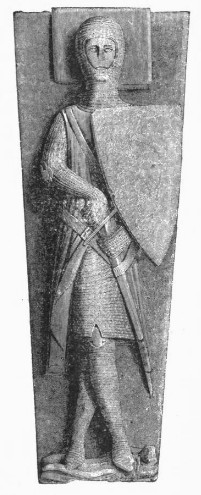
An effigy of William Longespée the Younger (d. 1250) in Salisbury Cathedral, showing an early triangular heater shield

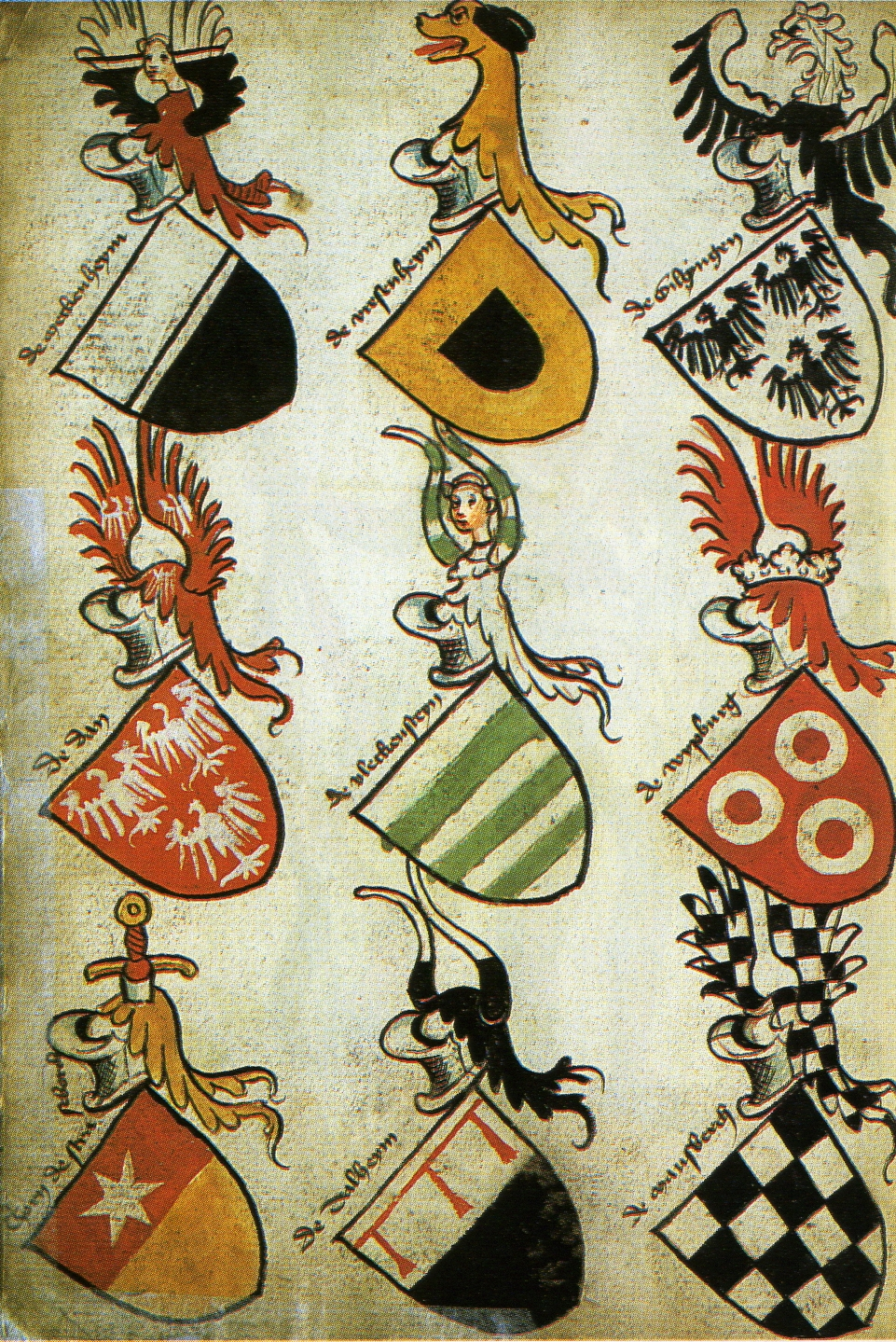
Heraldic roll of arms displaying heater-shaped heraldic shields or escutcheons. Hyghalmen Roll, Germany, late 15th century

The heater shield or heater-shaped shield is a form of European medieval shield, developing from the early medieval kite shield in the late 12th century in response to the declining importance of the shield in combat thanks to improvements in leg armour. The term is a neologism, created by Victorian antiquarians due to the shape's resemblance to a clothes iron. Examples are depicted in the great seal of Richard I and John, King of England.

== Details ==
Smaller than the kite shield, it was more manageable and could be used either mounted or on foot. From the 15th century, it evolved into highly specialized jousting shields, often containing a bouche, a notch or "mouth" for the lance to pass through. As plate armour began to cover more and more of the body, the shield grew correspondingly smaller. By the mid 14th century it was hardly seen outside of tournaments.

Heater shields were typically made from thin wood overlaid with leather, and were often braced with metals such as steel or iron. Some shields, such as that of Edward, the Black Prince from his tomb in Canterbury Cathedral, incorporated additional layers of gesso, canvas, and/or parchment.

Contrary to the common interpretations, heater shields did not strap to the arm, but were held and maneuvered by a combination of a hand-strap and a strap called a guige, which was slung around the neck and used to support the shield, as well as sling it around the back when not in use.

The heater shield was used by almost every class of society in medieval Europe, from knights to typical soldiers. This design lent itself to being relatively inexpensive and easy to make. It was relatively lightweight compared to other similar shields at the time such as the kite shield, being easy to move around during both mounted and on-foot combat, and had a fairly high amount of surface area, making for a solid defence.

This style of shield was not without its flaws. When using a heater shield properly, the legs are left almost entirely unprotected. This disadvantage can be eliminated by moving away from an opponent. "When a sword flies for your leg, make a downward blow to his face or around to his throat: His arms will be wasted more quickly than his head, Because the distance is manifest for a shorter time."

Unfortunately, there is very little contemporaneous documentation remaining in the world regarding the proper use of a heater shield with a sword or any other weapon.

Heater shields were often used for heraldic display, or display of the coat of arms of the wielder. This lent itself to the relatively wide surface area of the shield and its shape, which made it excellently suited for display.

== Bibliography ==
- Clements, John (1998). Medieval Swordsmanship: Illustrated Methods and Techniques, Boulder, Colorado: Paladin Press. ISBN 1-58160-004-6
- Edge, David and Paddock, John (1988). Arms & Armor of the Medieval Knight, New York: Crescent Books. ISBN 0-517-10319-2
- Grazebrook, George (1890). The Dates of Variously-shaped Shields With Coincident Dates and Examples.
- "Shield Straps and Holding of the Shield - end 12th Early 13th Century" Nathanaël Dos Reis / Translation : David Tétard (Dawn of Chivalry). 02. mars 2017. Access 20-June-2021.
