= Strapped shield =

Leather gripping straps on the back of shields during the Medieval period

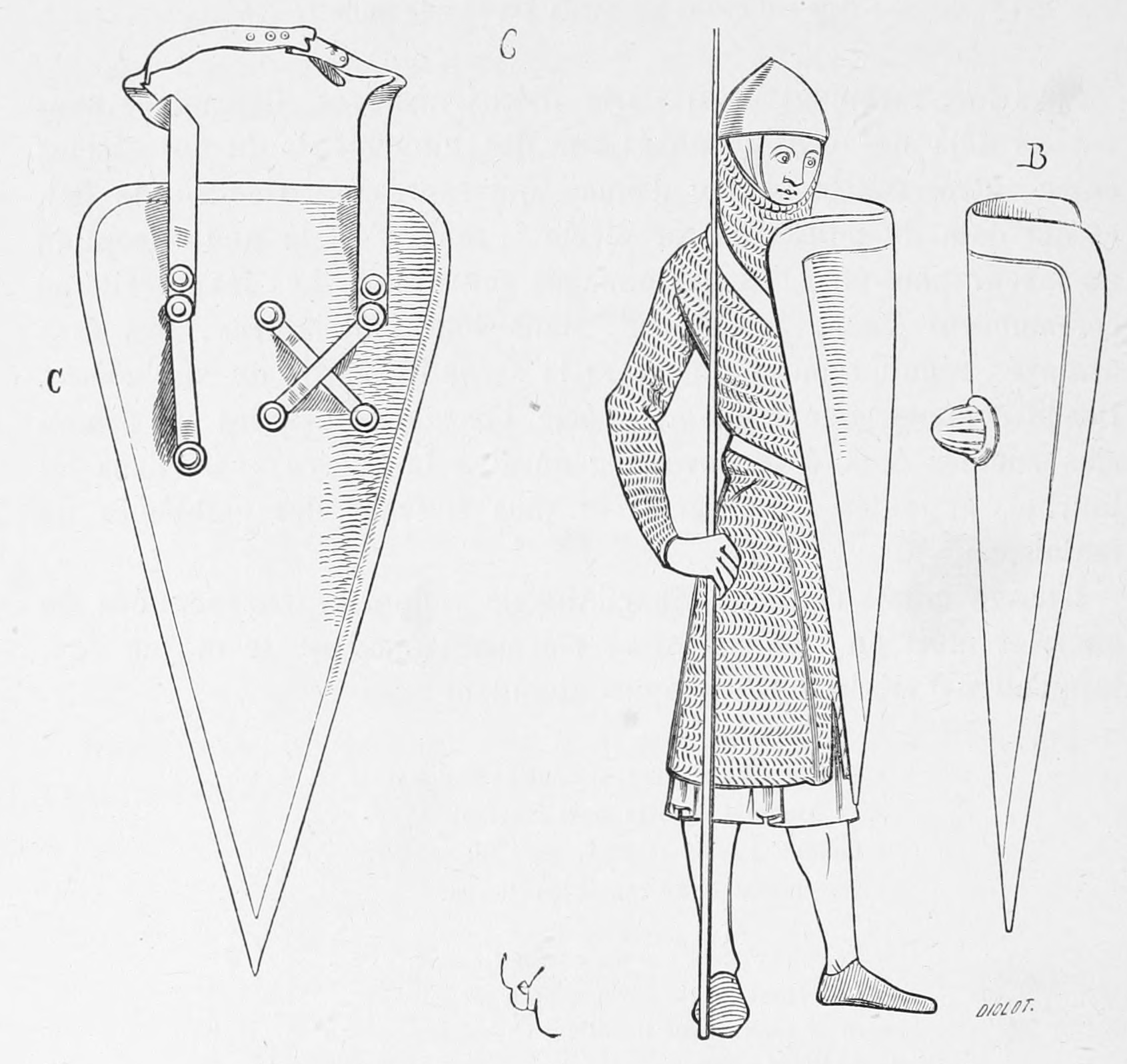
Strapped kite shield (12th century)

A strapped shield or arm shield is a shield which is attached to a user’s lower arm via leather gripping straps on the back of the shield, sometimes together with a guige (or ‘shield sling’), rather than wielded via a centre shield grip.

== Enarmes ==
Shield with enarmes highlighted

The straps of a strapped shield are called enarmes or simply shield straps. Enarmes were held in place by riveting through the leather and the facing of the shield, and reinforced with small, square-cut washers. Enarmes are visible on shields in the Bayeux Tapestry.

== See also ==
- Guige
