= Guige =

Strap for supporting a shield

Shield with guige highlighted in red outline

A guige (/ɡiːʒ/, /ɡiːd͡ʒ/) or shield sling is a long strap, typically made of leather, used to hang a shield on the shoulder or neck, either to help make the shield less vulnerable to moving out of position when struck or grabbed by an opponent during combat, or to take its weight when not in use. Used in combat, it could also free a soldier to use a weapon requiring two hands without discarding the shield; the shield could then be easily retrieved when needed.

Some guiges had a buckle to adjust the length. A guige could be attached to the shield anywhere along its rim, and could run horizontally, vertically, or diagonally across the diameter of the shield.

Most information about the usage of guiges comes from various Medieval works of art, such as the Bayeux Tapestry. Frequently in heraldry shields are depicted hanging from guige straps.

== See also ==
- Enarmes
