= Glagwa =

Bell-shaped shield

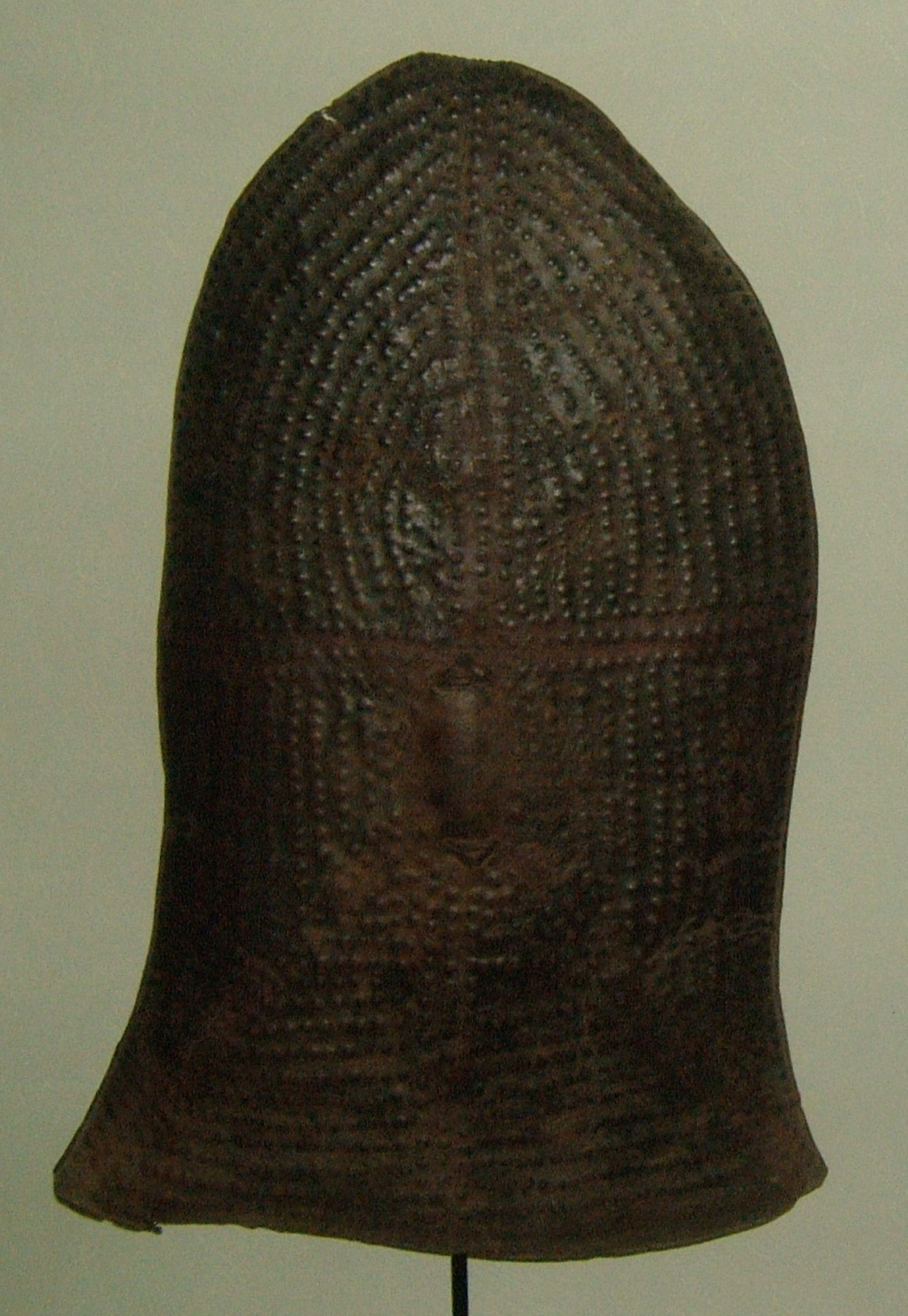
Glagwa shield

A Glagwa is a bell-shaped shield of the Wandala peoples of northern Cameroon.

== Uses ==
This type of shield was usually worn with an armor. It was made of leather (cow, buffalo or elephant), sometimes of hammered metal. The Zulgo, Lamang, Guduf, or Bana tribes also used this type of shield. Its name changed according to the tribes (for example the Zulgo people called them a "tlokwo") but it was the Wandala who invented this type of shield.
