= Roromaraugi =

Type of shield

A roromaraugi is a parrying shield from San Cristobal Island in the Solomon Islands.

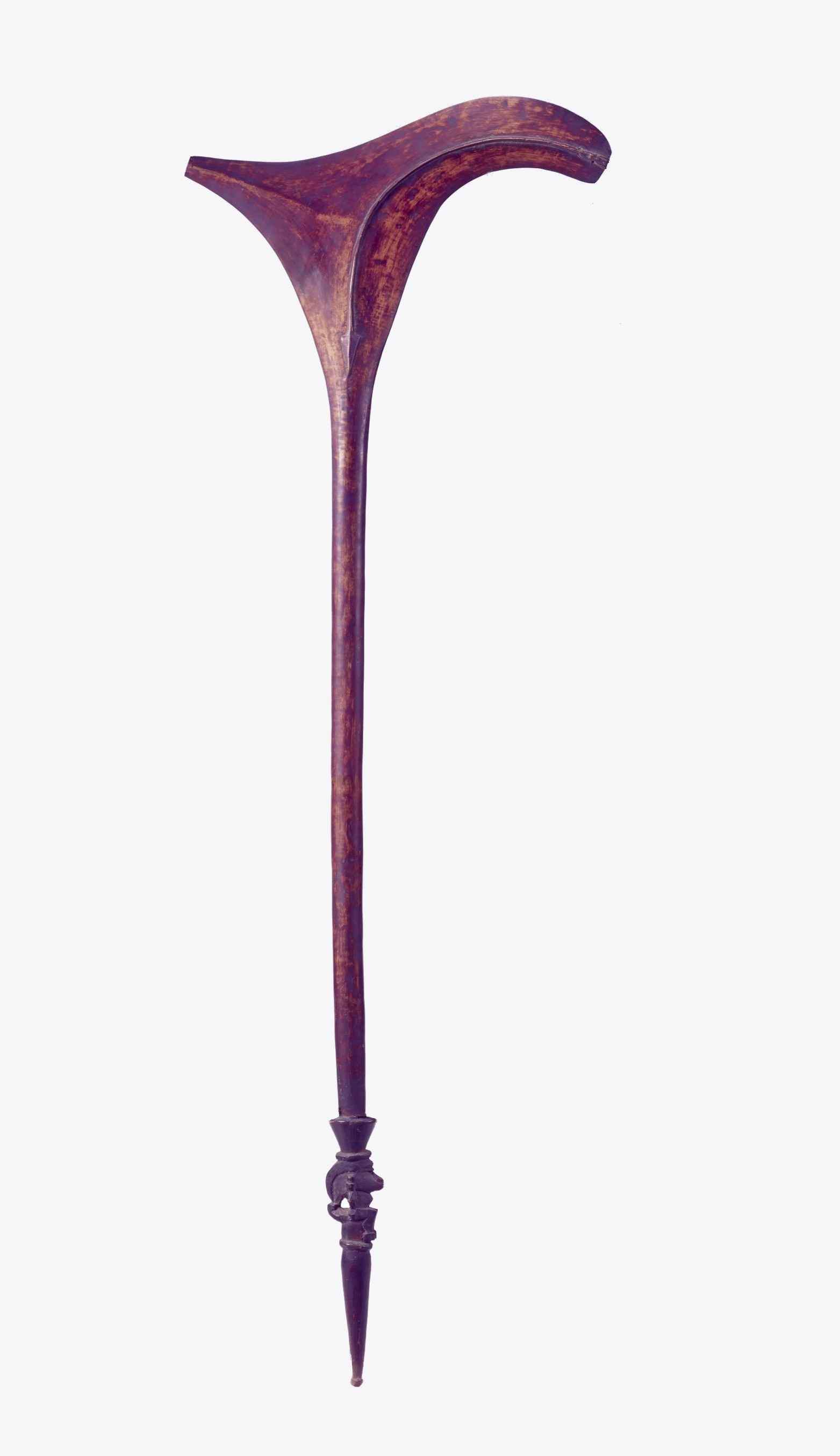
Roromaraugi

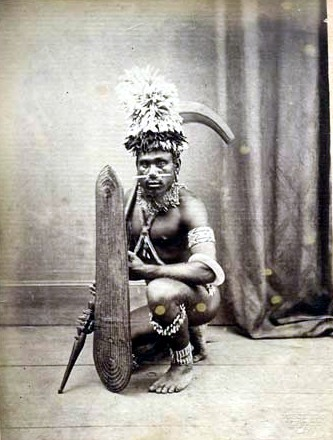
Makira warrior handling a roromaraugi in his right hand

== Uses ==
It was used to deflect the enemy’s arrows and spears. It has a broad sickle-shaped head that is separated by a well-marked central ridge with a spur on the back. The handle is often finished by an anthropomorphic sculpture and the whole is done in very hard wood. It was also used in war dances and measures more or less 150 cm (59 in). It should not be confused with the qauata which does not have a spur and looks more like a leaf.

== Bibliography ==
- Purissima Benitez, Jean-Paul Barbier, Alain-Michel Boyer, Boucliers d’Afrique, d’Asie du Sud-Est et d’Océanie, Paris, Éditions Adam Biro, 1998.
