= Qauata =

Shield from San Cristobal Island

A qauata or qauaata is a parrying shield or war club of the San Cristobal Island in the Solomon Islands.

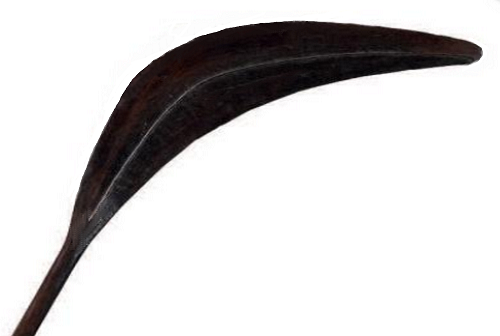
Leaf shaped qauata head

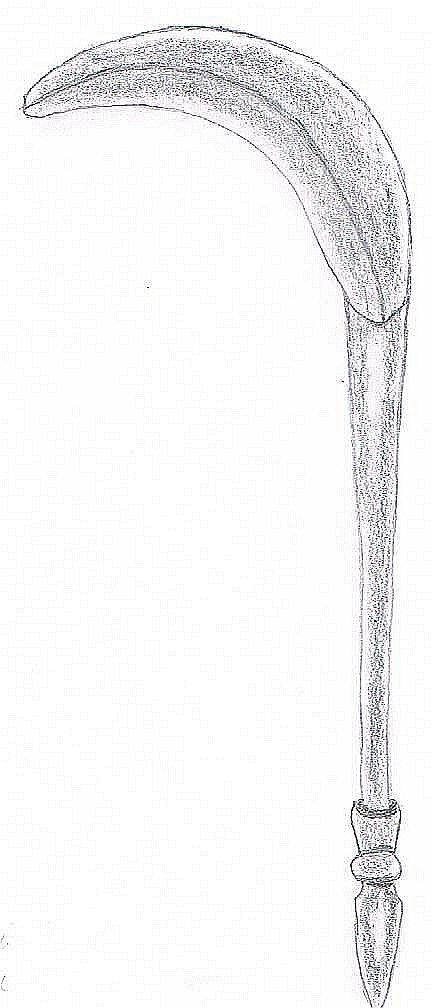
Drawing of a qauata

== Uses ==
It was used to deflect the enemy’s arrows and spears. It has a leaf-shaped head without an ergot, which distinguishes it from the roromaraugi. The head is separated in two by a central ridge and the handle is often finished by an anthropomorphic sculpture. It is more common than the roromaraugi and was used for war.

== Bibliography ==
- Purissima Benitez, Jean-Paul Barbier, Alain-Michel Boyer, Boucliers d’Afrique, d’Asie du Sud-Est et d’Océanie, Paris, Éditions Adam Biro, 1998.
