= Nguba =

Basket Shield

A Nguba is a basket shield of the peoples of the Oubangui region in the Republic of Congo.

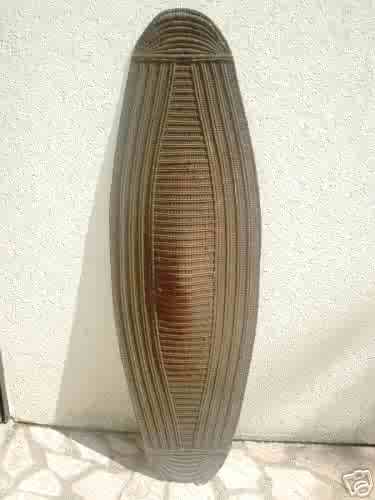
Nguba shield of the Ngombe from Congo

== Uses ==
This type of shield is found in many african ethnic groups, whether Bantu or not. It is called nguba, guba, wara or gele according to these tribes. It is made up of several layers of braided fibers and an oval piece of wood serves as a handle. This basketry work was traditionally reserved for men, except in the Ngiri and Poto where women could exercise it. The name Nguba comes from the proto-bantu gùbà word which means «shield». The Obambas sometimes used animal skin to make them.

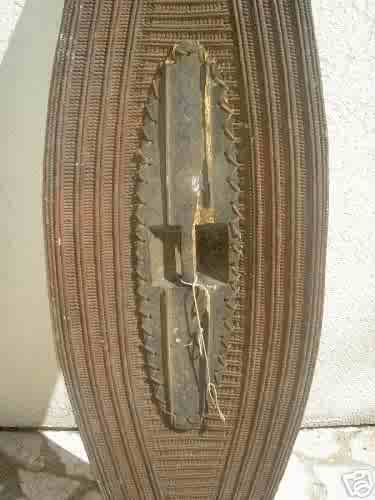
Nguba shield handle
