= Ancient Macedonian army =

Army of Philip II and Alexander the Great

Macedonian army
- Μακεδονικός στρατός
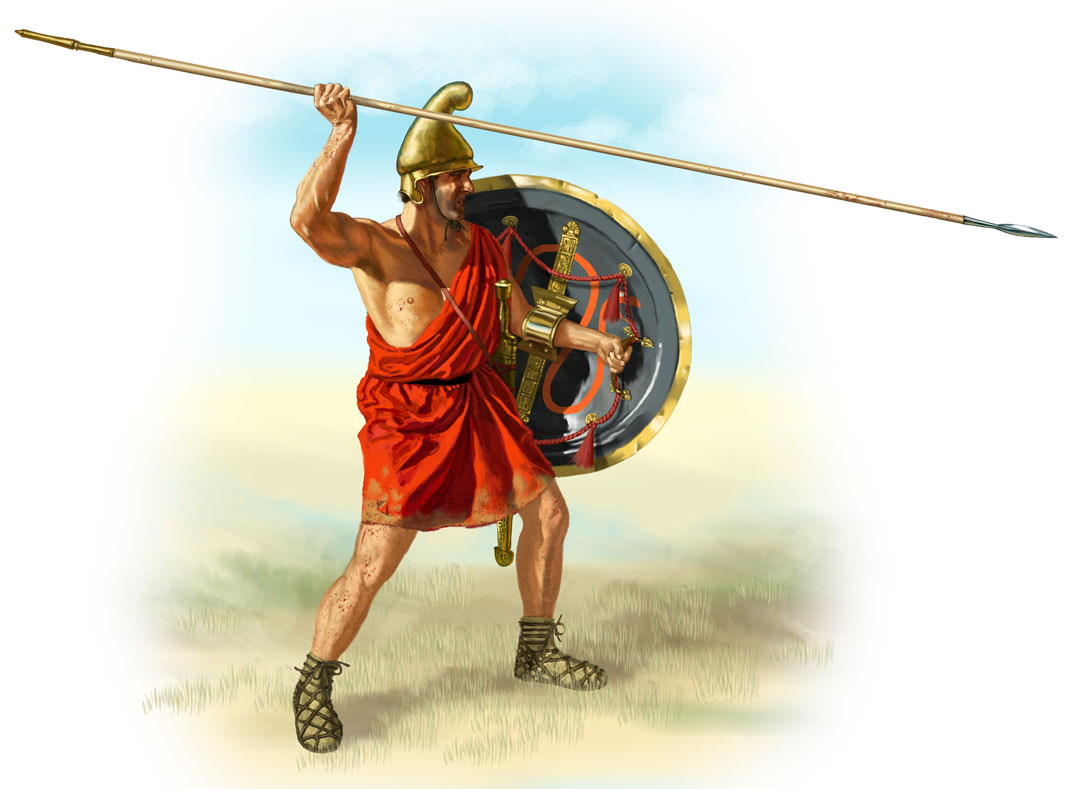
- Hypaspist in light equipment (modern reconstruction by J. Shumate)
- Leaders: Philip II of Macedon (359–336 BC); Alexander the Great (336–323 BC)
- Allegiance: Kingdom of Macedon; Hellenic League
- Headquarters: Pella, Lower Macedonia, Greece
- Active regions: Greece, Illyria, Thrace, Paionia, Danube Delta, Asia Minor, Syria, Phoenicia, Judea, Egypt, Mesopotamia, Persia, Sogdiana, Bactriana, India
- Size: 32,000+ (avg.) (Note: According to Diodorus Siculus, this was the size of the field army for Alexander's conquest of the Achaemenid Empire. However, this figure fluctuated during the campaign; Alexander commanded at least 47,000 troops during the Battle of Gaugamela, as an example.)

The Macedonian army was the army of Macedon under the leadership of Philip II and Alexander the Great. Macedonian army became noted for its speed of movement and proficiency in combat as one of the most effective and successful armies in the ancient world during the Rise of Macedon under Philip II and the campaigns of Alexander. After gaining an ascendancy in Greece the army was instrumental in the conquest of large swathes of territory stretching from Egypt in the west to India in the east. Initially of little account in the Greek world, Macedon was widely regarded as a second-rate power before being made formidable by Philip II, whose son and successor, Alexander the Great, conquered the Achaemenid Empire in just over a decade.

The latest innovations in weapons and tactics were adopted and refined by Philip, and he created a uniquely flexible and effective army. By introducing military service as a full-time occupation, Philip was able to drill his men regularly, ensuring unity and cohesion in his ranks. In a remarkably short time, this led to the development of one of what was among the world's finest military machines for the era. Tactical improvements included the latest developments in the deployment of the traditional Greek phalanx made by men like Epaminondas of Thebes and Iphicrates of Athens. Philip improved on these military innovators by using both Epaminondas' deeper phalanx and Iphicrates' combination of a longer spear and a smaller and lighter shield. However, the Macedonian king also innovated; he introduced the use of a much longer spear, the two-handed pike. The Macedonian pike, also known as the sarissa, gave its wielder many advantages both offensively and defensively. For the first time in Greek warfare, cavalry became a decisive arm in battle. The Macedonian army perfected the co-ordination of different troop types in an early example of combined arms tactics—the heavy infantry phalanx, skirmish infantry, archers, light cavalry and heavy cavalry, and siege engines were all deployed in battle; each troop type being used to its own particular advantage and creating a synergy of mutual support.

Ancient Macedonians and other Greeks (especially Thessalian cavalry) and a wide range of mercenaries from across the Aegean and the Balkans were employed by Phillip. By 338 BC, more than a half of the army for his planned invasion of the Achaemenid Empire came from outside of Macedon's borders—from all over the Greek world and the nearby barbarian tribes, such as the Illyrians, the Paeonians, and the Thracians.

As a result of uneven manuscript survival, most of the primary historical sources for this period have been lost, and scholarship is thus largely reliant on the works of the Greek historians Diodorus Siculus and Arrian, in addition to the incomplete writings of the Roman historian Curtius, all of whom lived centuries later than the events they describe in their works.

== Origins ==
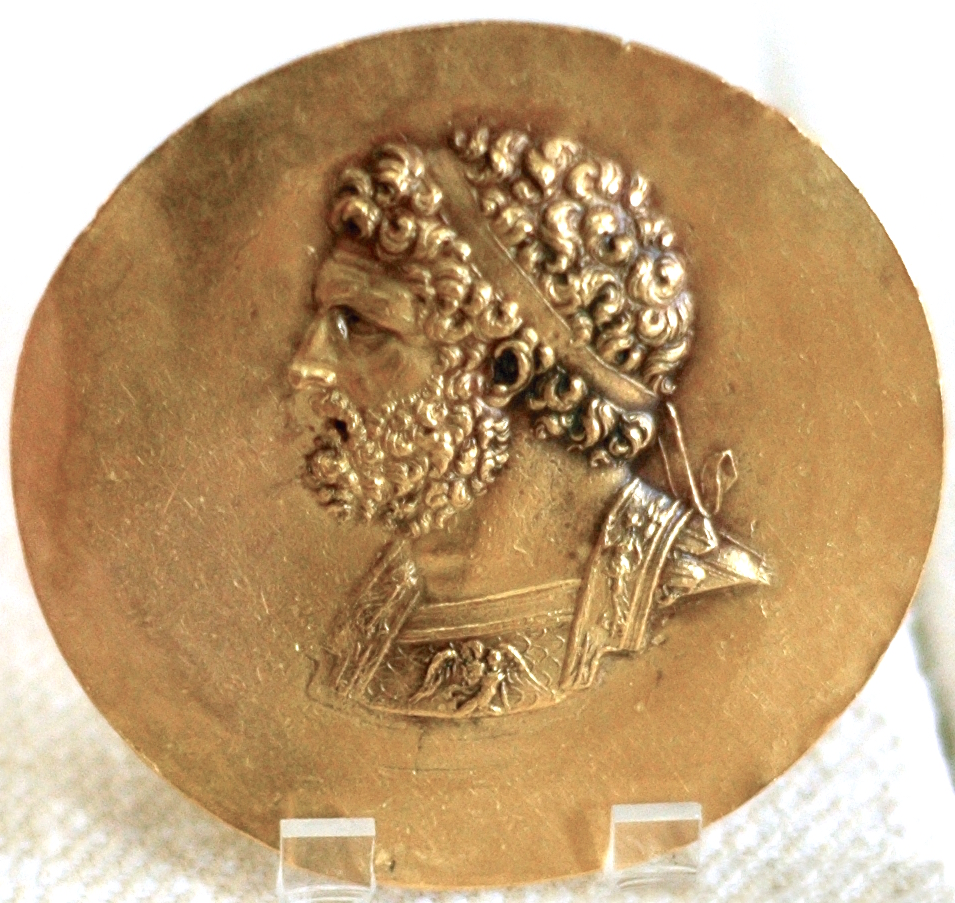
Philip II of Macedon - Roman medallion depicting the Macedonian king.

If Philip II of Macedon had not been the father of Alexander the Great, he would be more widely known as a first-rate military innovator, tactician and strategist, and as a consummate politician. The conquests of Alexander would have been impossible without the army his father created. Considered semi-barbarous by some metropolitan Greeks, the Macedonians were a martial people; they drank deeply of unwatered wine (the very mark of a barbarian) and no youth was considered to be fit to sit with the men at table until he had killed, on foot with a spear, a wild boar.

When Philip took over control of Macedon, it was a backward state on the fringes of the Greek world and was beset by its traditional enemies: Illyrians, Paeonians and Thracians. The basic structure of the army inherited by Philip II was the division of the companion cavalry (hetairoi) from the foot companions (pezhetairoi), augmented by various allied troops, foreign levied soldiers, and mercenaries. The foot companions existed perhaps since the reign of Alexander I of Macedon, while Macedonian troops are accounted for in the history of Herodotus as subjects of the Persian Empire fighting the Greeks at the Battle of Plataea in 479 BC. Macedonian cavalry, wearing muscled cuirasses, became renowned in Greece during and after their involvement in the Peloponnesian War (431–404 BC), at times siding with either Athens or Sparta and supplemented by local Greek infantry instead of relying on Macedonian infantry. Macedonian infantry in this period consisted of poorly trained shepherds and farmers, while the cavalry was composed of noblemen eager to win glory. An early 4th-century BC stone-carved relief from Pella shows a Macedonian hoplite infantryman wearing a pilos helmet and wielding a short sword showing a pronounced Spartan influence on the Macedonian army before Philip II.

Nicholas Sekunda states that at the beginning of Philip II's reign in 359 BC, the Macedonian army consisted of 10,000 infantry and 600 cavalry, the latter figure similar to that recorded for the 5th century BC. However, Malcolm Errington cautions that any figures for Macedonian troop sizes provided by ancient authors should be treated with a degree of skepticism, since there are very few means by which modern historians are capable of confirming their veracity (and could have been possibly lower or even higher than the numbers stated).

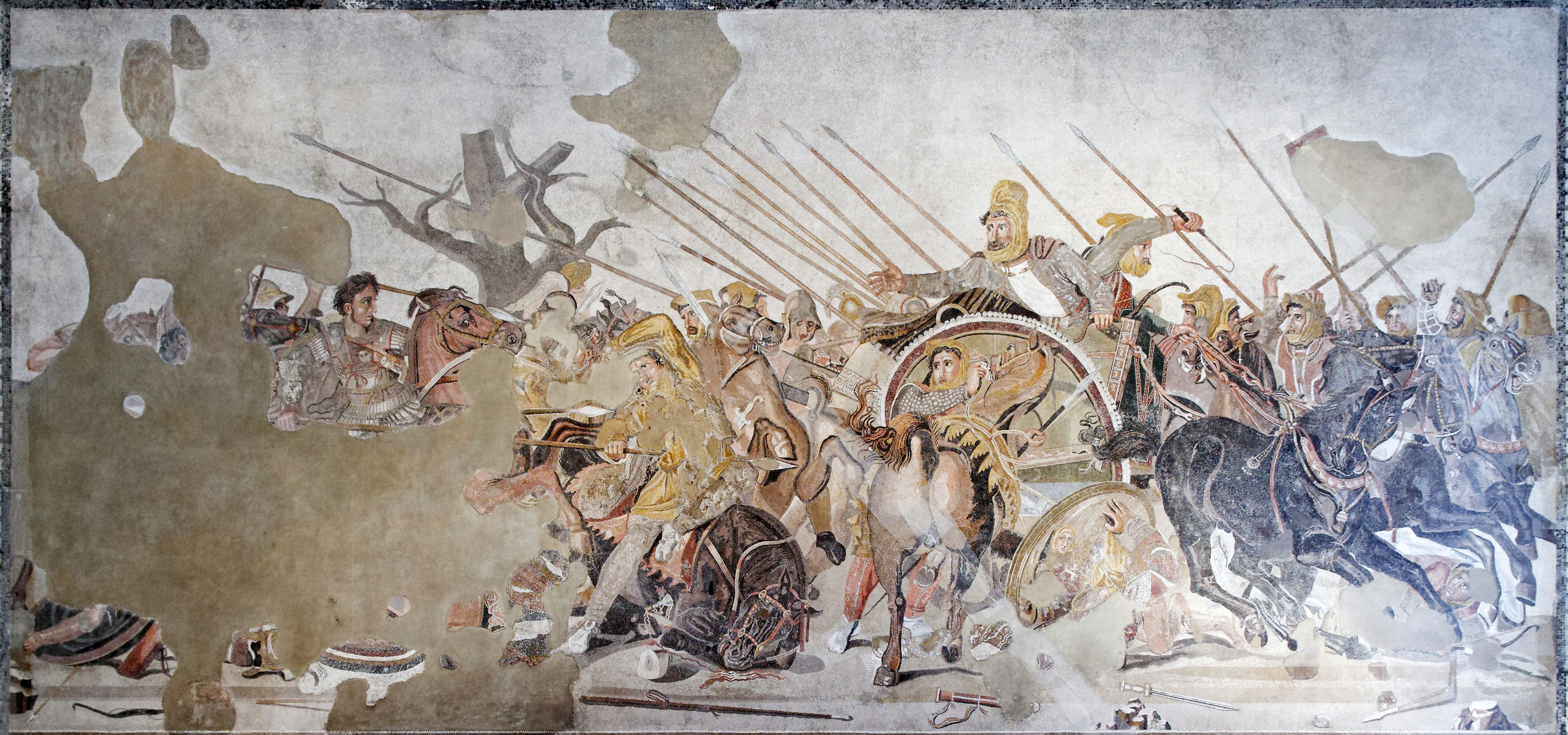
The Alexander Mosaic showing the Battle of Issus; a Roman copy of a Hellenistic painting, c. 100 BC

Philip's first achievement was to unify Macedon through his army. He raised troops and made his army the single fount of wealth, honour and power in the land; the unruly chieftains of Macedonia became the officers and elite cavalrymen of the army, the highland peasants became the footsoldiers. Philip took pains to keep them always under arms and either fighting or drilling. Manoeuvres and drills were made into competitive events, and the truculent Macedonians vied with each other to excel.

As a political counterbalance to the native-born Macedonian nobility, Philip invited military families from throughout Greece to settle on lands he had conquered or confiscated from his enemies, these 'personal clients' then also served as army officers or in the Companion cavalry. After taking control of the gold-rich mines of Mount Pangaeus, and the city of Amphipolis that dominated the region, he obtained the wealth to support a large army. It was a professional army imbued with a national spirit, an unusual combination for the Greek world of the time. The armies of contemporary Greek states were largely reliant on a combination of citizens and mercenaries. The former were not full-time soldiers, and the latter, though professional, had little or no inherent loyalty to their employers. By the time of his death, Philip's army had pushed the Macedonian frontier into southern Illyria, conquered the Paeonians and Thracians, asserted a hegemony over Thessaly, destroyed the power of Phocis and defeated and humbled Athens and Thebes. All the states of Greece, with the exception of Sparta, Epirus and Crete, had become subservient allies of Macedon (League of Corinth) and Philip was laying the foundations of an invasion of the Persian Empire, an invasion that his son (Alexander the Great) would successfully undertake.

One important military innovation of Philip II is often overlooked, he banned the use of wheeled transport and limited the number of camp servants to one to every ten infantrymen and one each for the cavalry. This reform made the baggage train of the army very small for its size and improved its speed of march.

== Troop types and unit organisation ==
=== Heavy cavalry ===
==== Companion cavalry ====
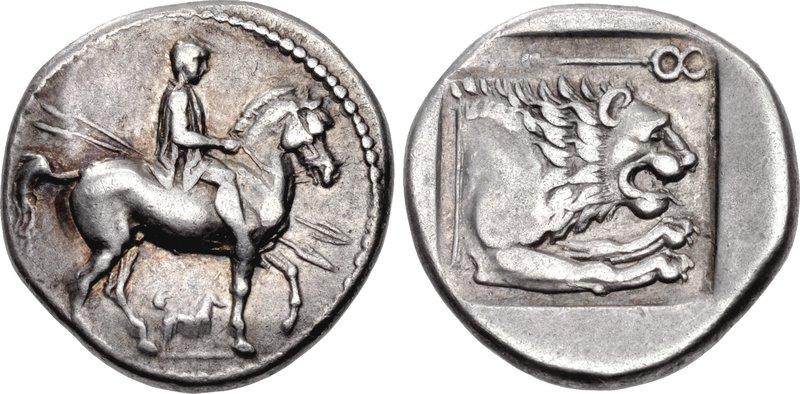
Coin of Perdikkas II showing a Macedonian cavalryman armed with two long javelins

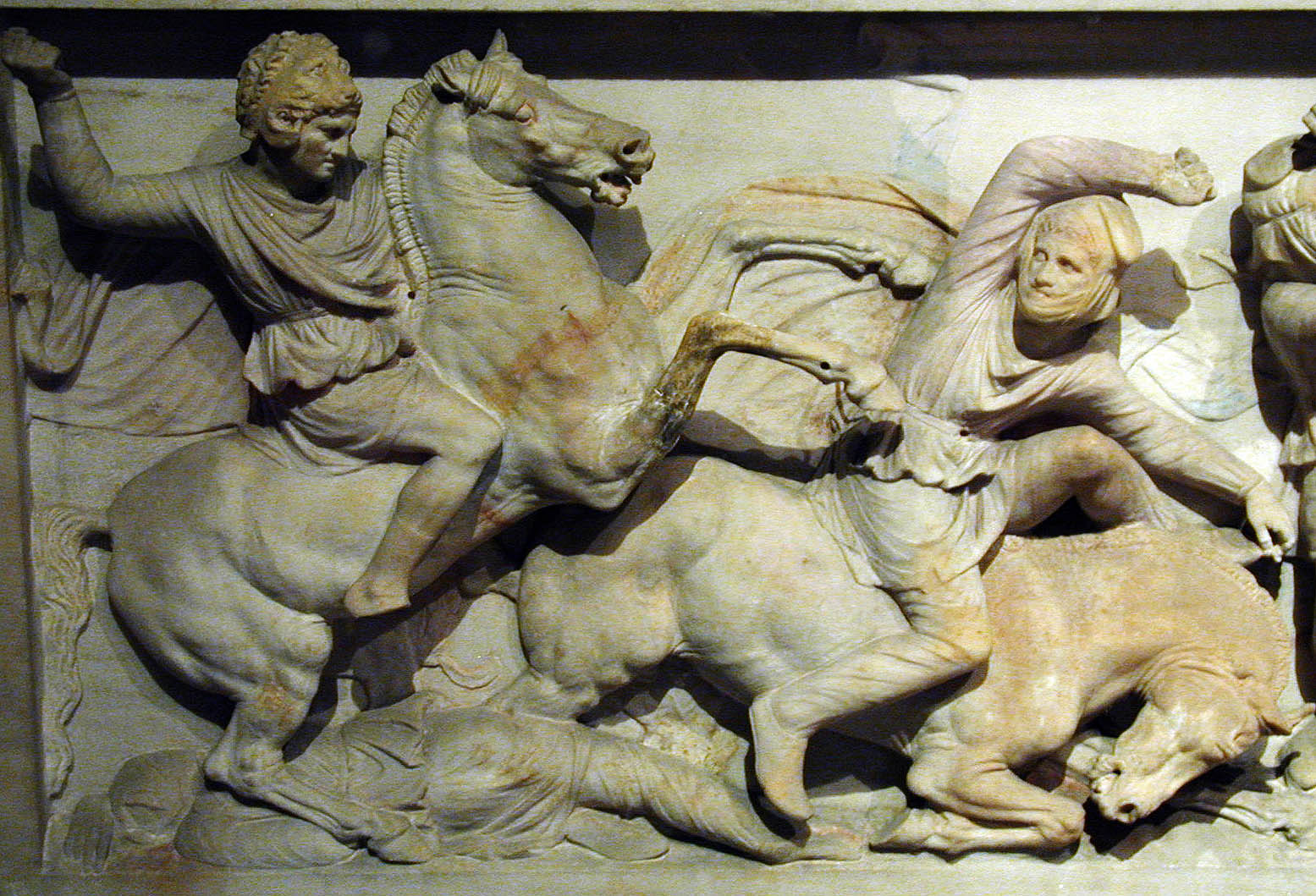
Alexander the Great as a cavalryman. He wears a helmet in the form of the lion-scalp of Herakles. Detail of the so-called Alexander Sarcophagus, excavated at Sidon.

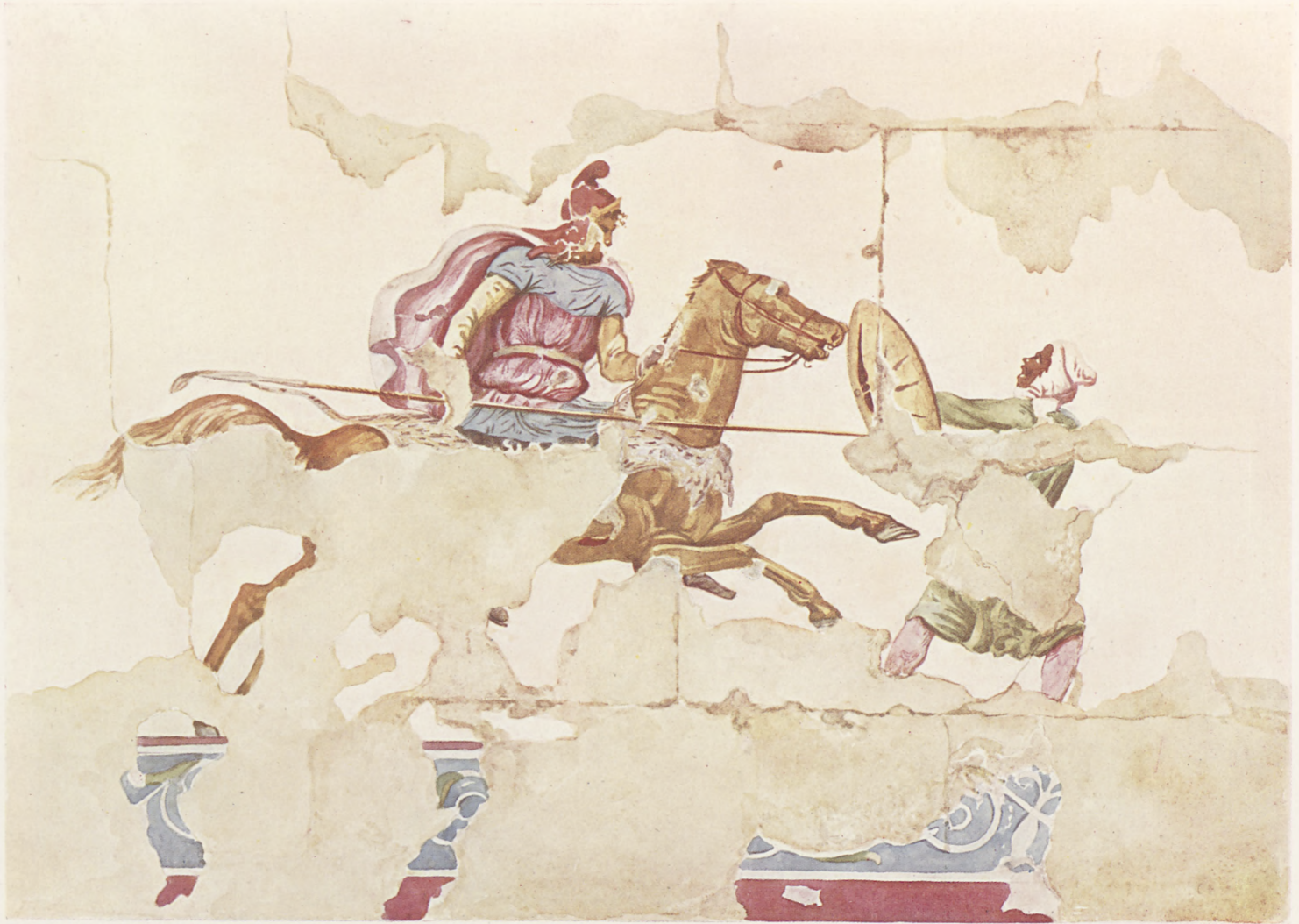
Based on a damaged fresco in the Kinch Tomb (310–290 BC, Lefkadia), depicting a Macedonian cavalryman wearing a Thracian helmet and wielding a lance. The repainting by Oscar Willerup.

The Companion cavalry, or Hetairoi (Ἑταῖροι), were the elite arm of the Macedonian army, and were the offensive force that made the decisive attack in most of the battles of Alexander the Great. They were unmatched in the pre-stirrup Ancient world in their ability to retain their seat and the control of their weapons through the impact of a charge. Along with Thessalian cavalry contingents, the Companions – raised from landed nobility – made up the bulk of the Macedonian heavy cavalry. Central Macedonia was good horse-rearing country and cavalry was prominent in Macedonian armies from early times. However, it was the reforms in organisation, drill and tactics introduced by Philip II that transformed the Companion cavalry into a battle-winning force, especially the introduction of, or increased emphasis on, the use of a lance and shock tactics. Coinage indicates that from an early period the primary weapons used by Macedonian cavalry were a pair of javelins. This remained true through to the reign of Archelaus I (413–399). Subsequently, despite the adoption of the lance, it is highly probable that the Companion cavalry continued to employ javelins when on scouting or skirmishing missions.

The hetairoi were divided into squadrons called ilai (singular: ilē), each 200 men strong, except for the Royal Squadron, which numbered 300. The Royal Squadron was also known as the Agema – "that which leads". Each squadron was commanded by an ilarchēs (ilarch) and appears to have been raised from a particular area of Macedon. Arrian, for instance, described squadrons from Bottiaea, Amphipolis, Apollonia and Anthemus. It is probable that Alexander took eight squadrons with him on his invasion of Asia totalling 1,800 men, leaving seven ilai behind in Macedon (the 1,500 cavalrymen mentioned by Diodorus). Between 330 BC and 328 BC, the Companions were reformed into regiments (hipparchies) of 2–3 squadrons. In conjunction with this, each squadron was divided into two lochoi. This was probably undertaken to allow for the increase in size of each squadron, as reinforcements and amalgamations meant that the Companion cavalry grew in size. At this time, Alexander abandoned the regional organisation of the ilai, choosing their officers regardless of their origins.

The individual Companion cavalry squadrons were usually deployed in a wedge formation, which facilitated both manoeuvrability and the shock of the charge. The advantage of the wedge was that it offered a narrow point for piercing enemy formations and concentrated the leaders at the front. It was easier to turn than a square formation because everyone followed the leader at the apex, "like a flight of cranes". Philip II introduced the formation, probably in emulation of Thracian and Scythian cavalry, though the example of the rhomboid formation adopted by Macedon's southern neighbours, the Thessalians, must also have had some effect.

The primary weapon of the Macedonian cavalry was the xyston, a double ended cornel-wood lance, with a sword as a secondary weapon. From descriptions of combat, it would appear that once in melee the Companion cavalryman used his lance to thrust at the chests and faces of the enemy. It is possible that the lance was aimed at the upper body of an opposing cavalryman in the expectation that a blow which did not wound or kill might have sufficient leverage to unseat. If the lance broke, the Companion could reverse it and use the other end, or draw his sword. Cleitus, an officer of the Companions, saved Alexander the Great's life at the Granicus by cutting off an enemy horseman's arm with his sword. Companion cavalrymen would normally have worn armour and a helmet in battle.

Although the Companion cavalry is largely regarded as the first real shock cavalry of Antiquity, it seems that Alexander was very wary of using it against well-formed infantry, as attested by Arrian in his account of the battle against the Malli, an Indian tribe he faced after Hydaspes. There, Alexander did not dare assault the dense infantry formation with his cavalry, but rather waited for his infantry to arrive, while he and his cavalry harassed their flanks. It is a common mistake to portray the Companion cavalry as a force able to burst through compact infantry lines. Alexander usually launched the Companions at the enemy after a gap had opened up between their units or disorder had already disrupted their ranks. However, the ancient historian Arrian implies that the Companion cavalry were successful in an assault, along with heavy infantry, on the Greek mercenary hoplites serving Persia in the closing stages of the Battle of Granicus. Their success may have been largely due to the poor morale of the hoplites, who had just witnessed the rest of their army broken and put to flight.

The original 1,800 Companions who accompanied Alexander to Asia were augmented by 300 reinforcements arriving from Macedon after the first year of campaigning. They were usually arrayed on the right flank (this being the position of honour in Hellenic armies, where the best troops would be positioned), and typically carried out the decisive manoeuvre/assault of the battle under Alexander's direct leadership.

==== Thessalian cavalry ====
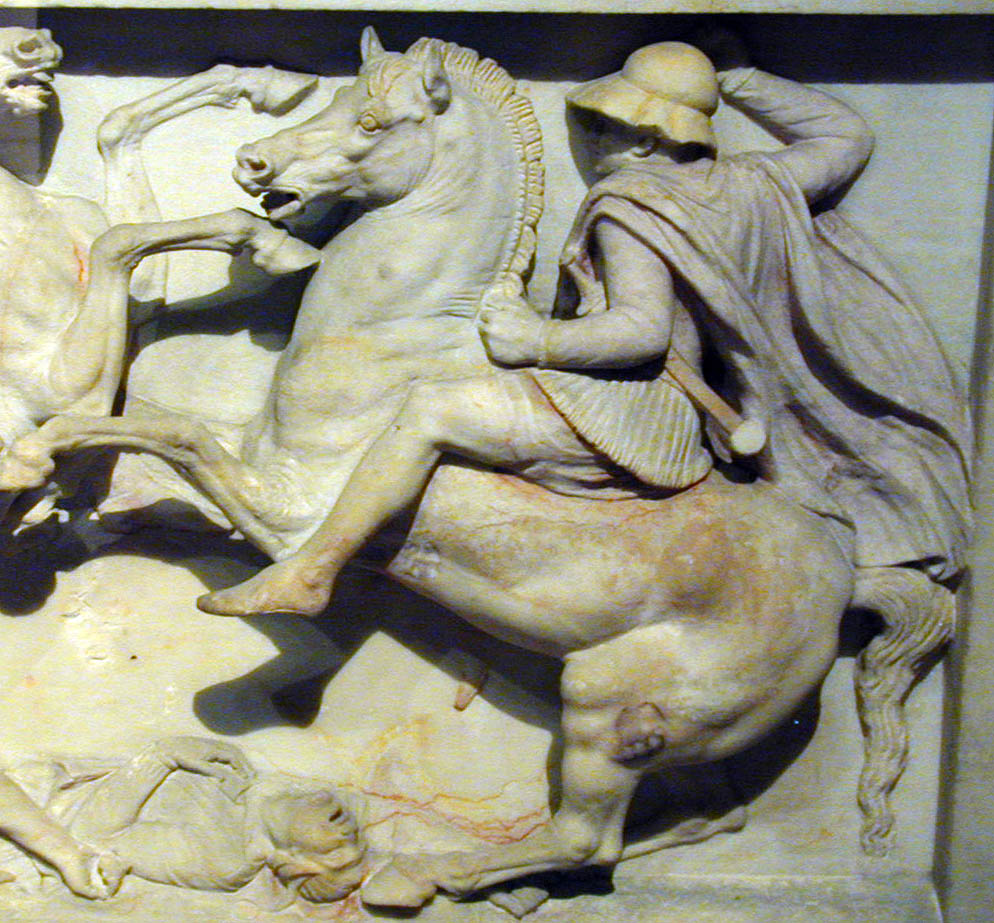
A heavy cavalryman of Alexander the Great's army, possibly a Thessalian. He wears a cuirass (probably a linothorax) and a Boeotian helmet, and is equipped with a scabbarded xiphos straight-bladed sword. Alexander Sarcophagus.

Following the defeat of Lycophron of Pherae and Onomarchos of Phocis, Philip II of Macedon was appointed Archon of the Thessalian League; his death induced the Thessalians to attempt to throw off Macedonian hegemony, but a short bloodless campaign by Alexander restored them to allegiance. The Thessalians were considered the finest cavalry of Greece.

The Thessalian heavy cavalry accompanied Alexander during the first half of his Asian campaign and continued to be employed by the Macedonians as allies until Macedon's final demise at the hands of the Romans. Its organization and weaponry were similar to the Companion Cavalry, though the earlier Thessalian way of fighting emphasised the use of javelins. The Thessalian cavalry was famed for its use of rhomboid formations, said to have been developed by the Thessalian Tagos (head of the Thessalian League) Jason of Pherae. This formation was very efficient for manoeuvring, as it allowed the squadron to change direction at speed while still retaining cohesion. The numbers given for Alexander's invasion of the Persian Empire included 1,800 such men. This number would have risen no higher than 2,000. They were typically entrusted with the defensive role of guarding the left flank from enemy cavalry, allowing the decisive attack to be launched on the right. They often faced tremendous opposition when in this role. At Issus and Gaugamela, the Thessalians withstood the attack of Persian cavalry forces, though greatly outnumbered.

At Ecbatana, the Thessalians with Alexander's army were disbanded and sent home. Some remained with the army as mercenaries, yet these too were sent home a year later when the army reached the Oxus River.

==== Other Greek cavalry ====
The Hellenic states allied to, or more accurately under the hegemony of, Macedon provided contingents of heavy cavalry and the Macedonian kings hired mercenaries of the same origins. Alexander had 600 Greek cavalrymen at the start of his campaign against Persia, probably organised into 5 ilai. These cavalrymen would have been equipped very similarly to the Thessalians and Companions, but they deployed in a square formation eight deep and sixteen abreast. The Greek cavalry was not considered as effective or versatile as the Thessalian and Macedonian cavalry.

=== Light cavalry ===
Light cavalry, such as the prodromoi (literal trans. "those who run ahead"), secured the wings of the army during battle and went on reconnaissance missions. There is some ambiguity concerning the use of the term prodromoi by the sources; it may have been used to describe any cavalry undertaking a scouting, skirmishing or screening mission, or it may have denoted a single unit, or indeed both. Apart from the prodromoi (in the sense of a single unit), other horsemen from subject or allied nations, filling various tactical roles and wielding a variety weapons, rounded out the cavalry. By the time Alexander campaigned in India, and subsequently, the cavalry had been drastically reformed and included thousands of horse-archers from Iranian peoples such as the Dahae (prominent at the Battle of Hydaspes).

==== Prodromoi/Sarissophoroi (cavalry unit) ====
Scholarship is divided as to the ethnic composition of the prodromoi of the Macedonian army. Most authorities regard the prodromoi as being raised from Macedonians, which would parallel the Athenian prodromoi, who were raised from the Thetes, the lowest census class of Athenian citizens. Sekunda, however, gives them an origin from Thrace. Arrian usually differentiates the prodromoi from the Paeonian light cavalry, which suggests a fixed ethnic composition. This uncertainty is probably due to the lack of a definite understanding of the use of the term prodromoi by the primary sources, referred to above. The prodromoi, are sometimes referred to as sarissophoroi, "pikemen" or "lancers", which leads to the conclusion that they sometimes were armed with an uncommonly long xyston (believed to be 14 ft long), though certainly not an infantry pike. In the primary sources, Arrian mentions that Aretes commanded the prodromoi; in the same context Curtius says that Aretes commanded the sarissophoroi. It would appear that the same unit of cavalry was known by both names.

The prodromoi/sarissophoroi acted as scouts, reconnoitering in front of the army when it was on the march. In battle, they were used in a shock role to protect the right flank of the Companion cavalry. Persian light cavalry took over scouting duties when they became available to the Macedonian army following Gaugamela. The prodromoi then assumed a purely battlefield role as shock cavalry. It is possible that the prodromoi, due to their skill in wielding long lances and their extensive battle experience, were considered more valuable in the role of shock cavalry, especially after the departure of the Thessalian cavalry. Four ilai, each 150 strong, of prodromoi operated with Alexander's army in Asia.

At Gaugamela, the prodromoi under Aretes were responsible for finally routing the Persian left wing cavalry, winning the battle in this sector.

==== Paeonian cavalry ====
These light cavalry were recruited from Paeonia, a tribal region to the north of Macedonia. The Paeones had been conquered and reduced to tributary status by Philip II. Led by their own chieftains, the Paeonian cavalry was usually brigaded with the Prodromoi and often operated alongside them in battle. They appear to have been armed with javelins and swords and are, unusually, described as carrying shields. Initially only one squadron strong, they received 500 reinforcements in Egypt and a further 600 at Susa.

==== Thracian cavalry ====
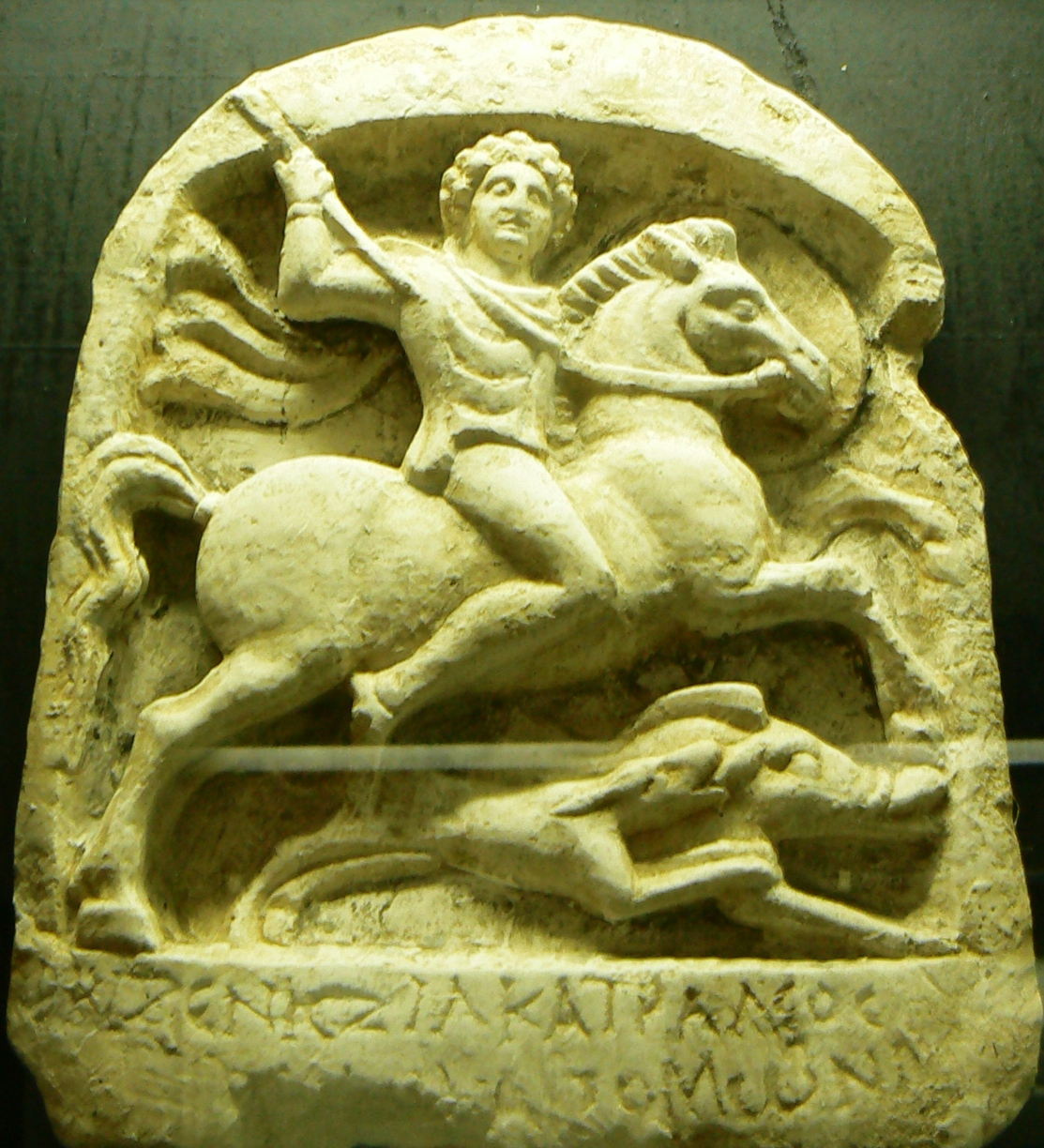
Javelin-armed Thracian horseman - hunting wild boar.

Largely recruited from the Odrysian tribe, the Thracian cavalry also acted as scouts on the march. In battle, they performed much the same function as the Prodromoi and Paeonians, except they guarded the flank of the Thessalian cavalry on the left wing of the army. The Thracians deployed in their ancestral wedge formations and were armed with javelins and swords. At Gaugamela, the Thracians fielded four ilai and were about 500 strong.

==== Horse archers ====
In 329 BC, Alexander, while in Sogdiana, created a 1,000 strong unit of horse archers that was recruited from various Iranian peoples. They were very effective at scouting and in screening the rest of the army from the enemy. Firing their bows whilst mounted, they offered highly mobile missile fire on the battlefield. At the Battle of Hydaspes, the massed fire of the horse archers was effective at disordering the Indian cavalry and helped to neutralise the Indian chariots.

=== Heavy infantry ===
==== The Foot Companions ====
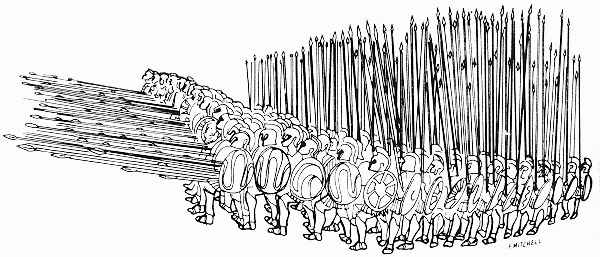
A drawing of a Macedonian phalanx. The shields depicted are smaller and lighter than those employed in a traditional hoplite phalanx, the sarissa is twice as long as the hoplite spear and fully enclosed helmets weren't as widespread as this drawing suggests.

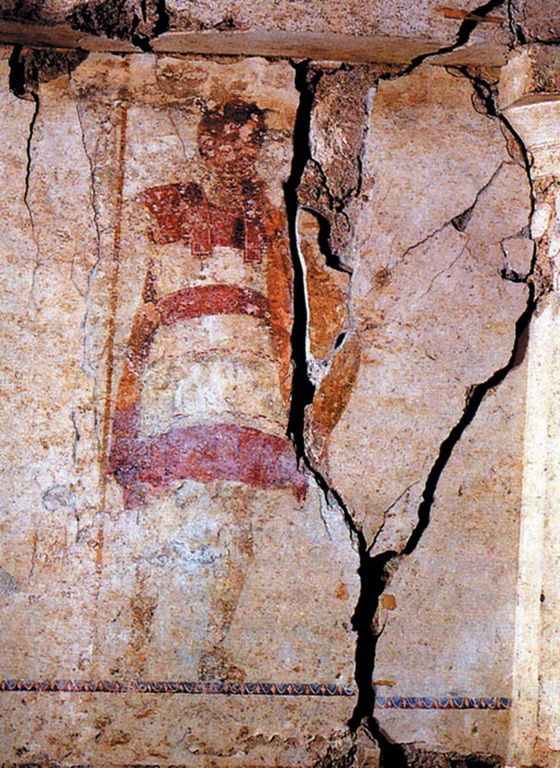
Painted depiction of a soldier wearing the linothorax, from the Tomb of Judgement at Mieza in Imathia, Central Macedonia, Greece, 4th/3rd century BC

Suitable men from the Macedonian peasantry were recruited into an infantry formation, called the phalanx. It was developed by Philip II, and later used by his son Alexander the Great in his conquest of the Achaemenid Persian Empire. These infantrymen were called Pezhetairoi, which translates as 'Foot Companions'.

Philip II spent much of his youth as a hostage at Thebes, where he studied under the renowned general Epaminondas, whose reforms formed the basis of Philip's later tactics. The equipment of the Macedonian phalangite is believed to have been influenced by the 'peltast' developed by the Athenian general Iphicrates. The Iphicratean peltast was not a skirmisher but a form of light hoplite, characterised by using a longer spear and smaller shield. However, the introduction of the sarissa pike in conjunction with a smaller shield seem to have been innovations devised by Philip himself, or at the very least he produced the definitive synthesis of earlier developments. Diodorus claimed that Philip was inspired to make changes in the organisation of his Macedonian infantry from reading a passage in the writings of Homer describing a close-packed formation.

Imitating the Greek example of martial exercises and issuing of standard equipment for citizen soldiery, Philip II transformed the Macedonian army from a levied force of farmers into a well-trained fighting force. Foot Companions were levied from the peasantry of Macedon. Once levied they became professional soldiers. Discharge could only be granted by the King. Under Philip, the Foot Companions received no regular pay. This seems to have changed by Alexander's time as during the mutiny at Opis in 324 BC, the men were chastised by Alexander for having run up debts despite earning "good pay". Through extensive drilling and training, the Foot Companions were able to execute complex manoeuvres in absolute silence, an ability that was fascinating and unnerving to enemies.

These foot-soldiers fought in close-ranked rectangular or square formations, of which the smallest tactical unit was the 256 men strong syntagma or speira. This formation typically fought eight or sixteen men deep and in a frontage of thirty-two or sixteen men accordingly. Each file of 16 men, a lochos, was commanded by a lochagos who was in the front rank. Junior officers, one at the rear and one in the centre, were in place to steady the ranks and maintain the cohesion of the formation, similar to modern-day NCOs. The commander of the syntagma theoretically fought at the head of the extreme far-right file. According to Aelian, a syntagma was accompanied by five additional individuals to the rear: a herald (to act as a messenger), a trumpeter (to sound out commands), an ensign (to hold the unit's standard), an additional officer (called ouragos), and a servant. This array of both audial and visual communication methods helped to make sure that even in the dust and din of battle orders could still be received and given. Six syntagmata formed a taxis of 1,500 men commanded by a strategos, a variable number of taxeis formed a phalanx under a phalangiarch. On his Asian campaign, Alexander, had a phalanx of 6 veteran taxeis, numbering 9,000 men. Between Susa and India a seventh taxis was created. Antipater, as regent in Macedonia, was left with 8 taxeis of younger, less-experienced recruits.

Each phalangite carried as his primary weapon a sarissa, which was a type of pike. The length of these pikes was such that they had to be wielded with two hands in battle. The traditional Greek hoplite used his spear single-handed, as the large Argive or Argolic shield needed to be gripped by the left hand, therefore the Macedonian phalangite gained in both weapon reach and in the added force of a two handed thrust. At close range, such large weapons were of little use, but an intact phalanx could easily keep its enemies at a distance; the weapons of the first five rows of men all projected beyond the front of the formation, so that there were more spearpoints than available targets at any given time. The men of the rear ranks raised their sarissas so as to provide protection from aerial missiles. A phalangite also carried a sword as a secondary weapon for close quarter fighting should the phalanx disintegrate. The phalanx, however, was extremely vulnerable in the flanks and rear.

The phalangite was equipped with a shield, often called the 'Telamon shield', which was smaller and less deeply convex than the Agive shield employed by Greek hoplites (and probably the hypaspists). The extent to which phalangites were armoured is unclear, and may have changed over time. They were equipped with helmets and greaves, but do not appear to have worn the thorax at the time of Philip II, as this armour is not mentioned as forming part of the necessary equipment for sarissa-armed infantry. The thorax is, however, shown being worn by an infantryman on the Alexander Sarcophagus, however, this figure is equipped with an 'Argive' shield and may depict a hypaspist, rather than a phalangite. It is indicated in the Military Decree of Amphipolis that the phalangites wore the kotthybos, a form of defence of uncertain nature.

Alexander did not use the phalanx as the decisive arm in his battles, but instead used it to pin and demoralize the enemy while his heavy cavalry would charge selected opponents or exposed enemy unit flanks, usually after driving the enemy horse from the field. Polybius (18.31.5), emphasises that the phalanx required flat open places for its effective deployment, as broken country would hinder and break up its formation.

The phalanx carried with it a fairly minimal baggage train, with only one servant for every ten men. This gave it a marching speed that contemporary armies could not hope to match — on occasion forces surrendered to Alexander simply because they were not expecting him to show up for several more days. This was made possible thanks to the training Philip instilled in his army, which included regular forced marches.

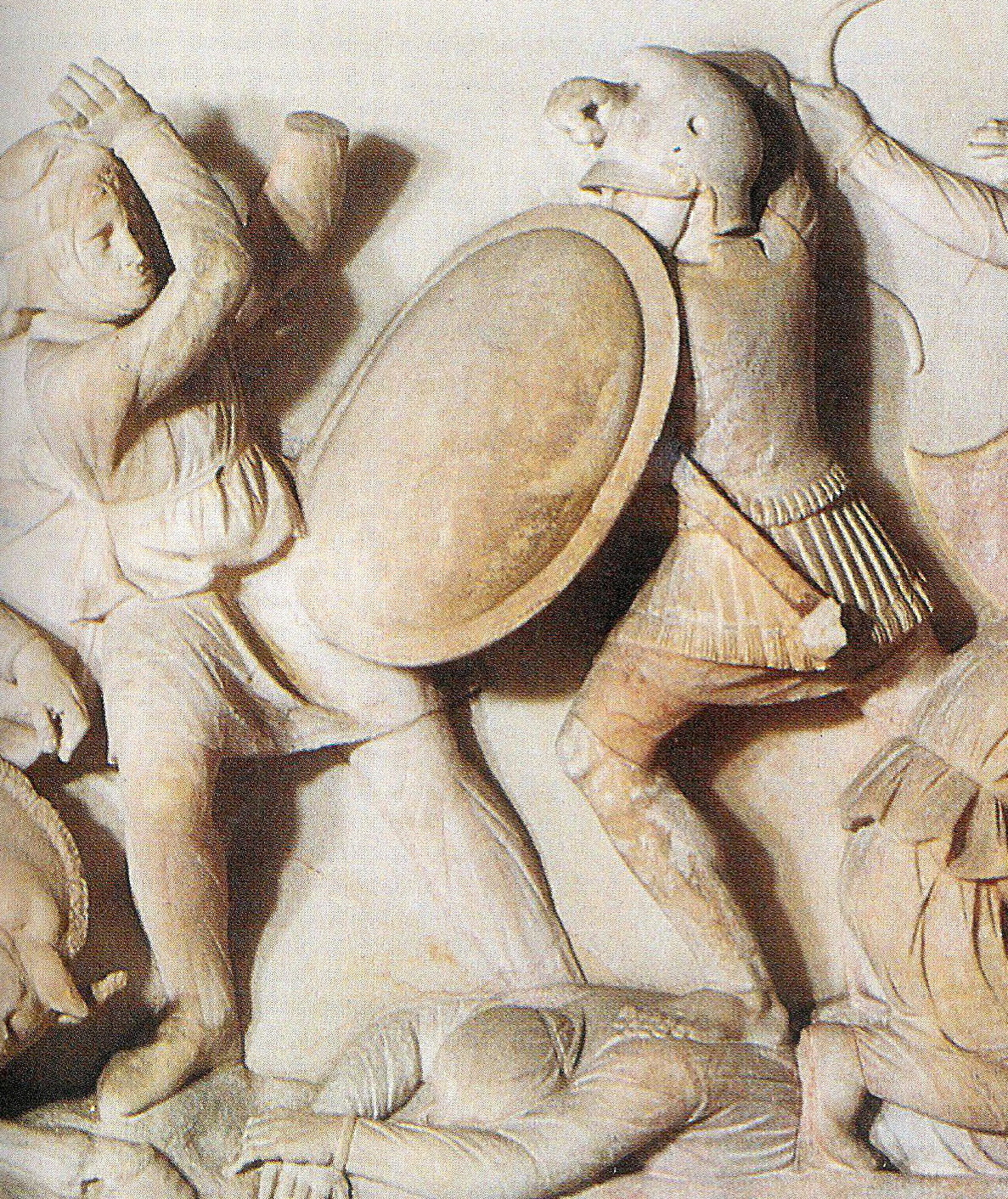
Ancient depiction of a Macedonian infantryman (right). He is equipped with an Argive shield, so probably is a Hypaspist. He also wears a linothorax cuirass and a Thracian helmet. Alexander Sarcophagus.

==== Hypaspists ====
The Hypaspists (Hypaspistai) were the elite arm of the Macedonian infantry. The word 'hypaspists' translates into English as 'shield-bearers'. During a pitched battle, such as Gaugamela, they acted as guard for the right flank of the phalanx and as a flexible link between the phalanx and the Companion cavalry. They were used for a variety of irregular missions by Alexander, often in conjunction with the Agrianians (elite skirmishers), the Companions and select units of phalangites. They were prominent in accounts of Alexander's siege assaults in close proximity to Alexander himself. The Hypaspists were of privileged Macedonian blood and their senior chiliarchy (χιλιαρχία) formed the agema foot bodyguard of Alexander III.

The organisation of the hypaspist regiment seems to have been into units of 500 (pentakosiarchies) before 331 and later, by 327, it was divided into three battalions (chiliarchies) of 1,000 men, which were then further sub-divided in a manner similar to the Foot Companions. Each battalion would be commanded by a chiliarch, with the regiment as a whole under the command of an archihypaspist.

In terms of weaponry, they were probably equipped in the style of a traditional Greek hoplite with a thrusting spear or doru (shorter and less unwieldy than the sarissa) and a large round shield. As well as this, they would have carried a sword, either a xiphos or a kopis. This would have made them far better suited to engagements where formations and cohesion had broken down, making them well suited to siege assaults and special missions. Their armour appears to have varied depending on the type of mission they were conducting. When taking part in rapid forced marches or combat in broken terrain, so common in the eastern Persian Empire, it appears that they wore little more than a helmet and a cloak (exomis) so as to enhance their stamina and mobility. However, when engaging in heavy hand-to-hand fighting, for instance during a siege or pitched battle, they would have worn body armour of either linen or bronze. This variety of armaments made them an extremely versatile force. Their numbers were kept at full strength, despite casualties, by continual replenishment through the transfer of veteran soldiers chosen from the phalanx.

A new term for hypaspistai emerged after the Battle of Gaugamela in 331 BC: the argyraspides ('silver shields'). The latter continued to serve after the reign of Alexander the Great and may have been of Asian origin. However, in regards to both the argyraspides and chalkaspides ('bronze shields'), Malcolm Errington asserts that "these titles were probably not functional, perhaps not even official." Sekunda states that Alexander's pike-wielding infantry numbered some 12,000 men, 3,000 of which were elite hypaspistai and 9,000 of which were pezhetairoi. However, in discussing the discrepancies among ancient historians about the size of Alexander the Great's army, N. G. L. Hammond and F. W. Walbank choose Diodorus Siculus' figure of 32,000 infantry as the most reliable, while disagreeing with his figure for cavalry at 4,500, asserting it was closer to 5,100 horsemen.

==== Greek hoplites ====
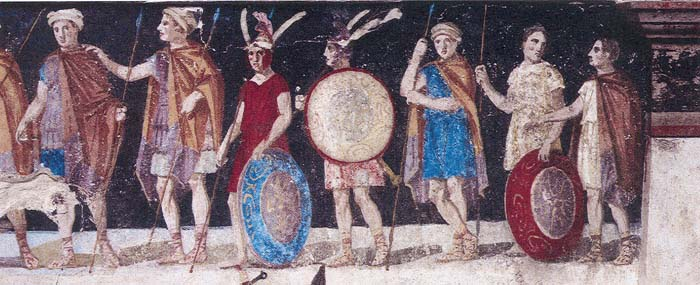
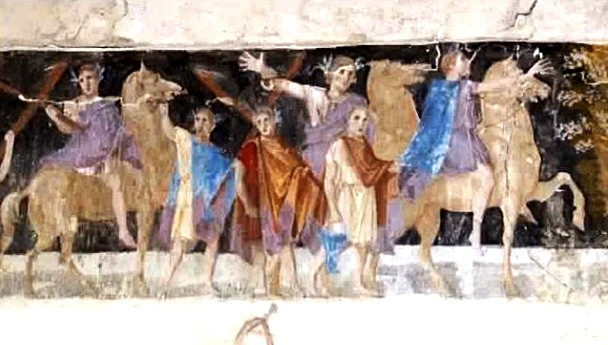
An ancient fresco of Macedonian soldiers from the tomb of Agios Athanasios, Thessaloniki, Macedonia, Greece, 4th century BC

The army led by Alexander the Great into the Persian Empire included Greek heavy infantry in the form of allied contingents provided by the League of Corinth and hired mercenaries. These infantrymen would have been equipped as hoplites with the traditional hoplite panoply consisting of a thrusting spear (doru), bronze-faced Argive shield and body armour. In appearance, they would have been almost identical to the hypaspists. In battle, the Greek hoplites had a less active role than the Macedonian phalangites and hypaspists. At Gaugamela, the Greek infantry formed the defensive rear of the box formation Alexander arranged his army into, while the Macedonians formed its front face. Nevertheless, they performed a valuable function in facing down attempts by the Persian cavalry to surround the Macedonian army and helped deal with the breakthrough of some Persian horsemen who went on to attack the baggage.

=== Light infantry ===
==== Peltasts ====
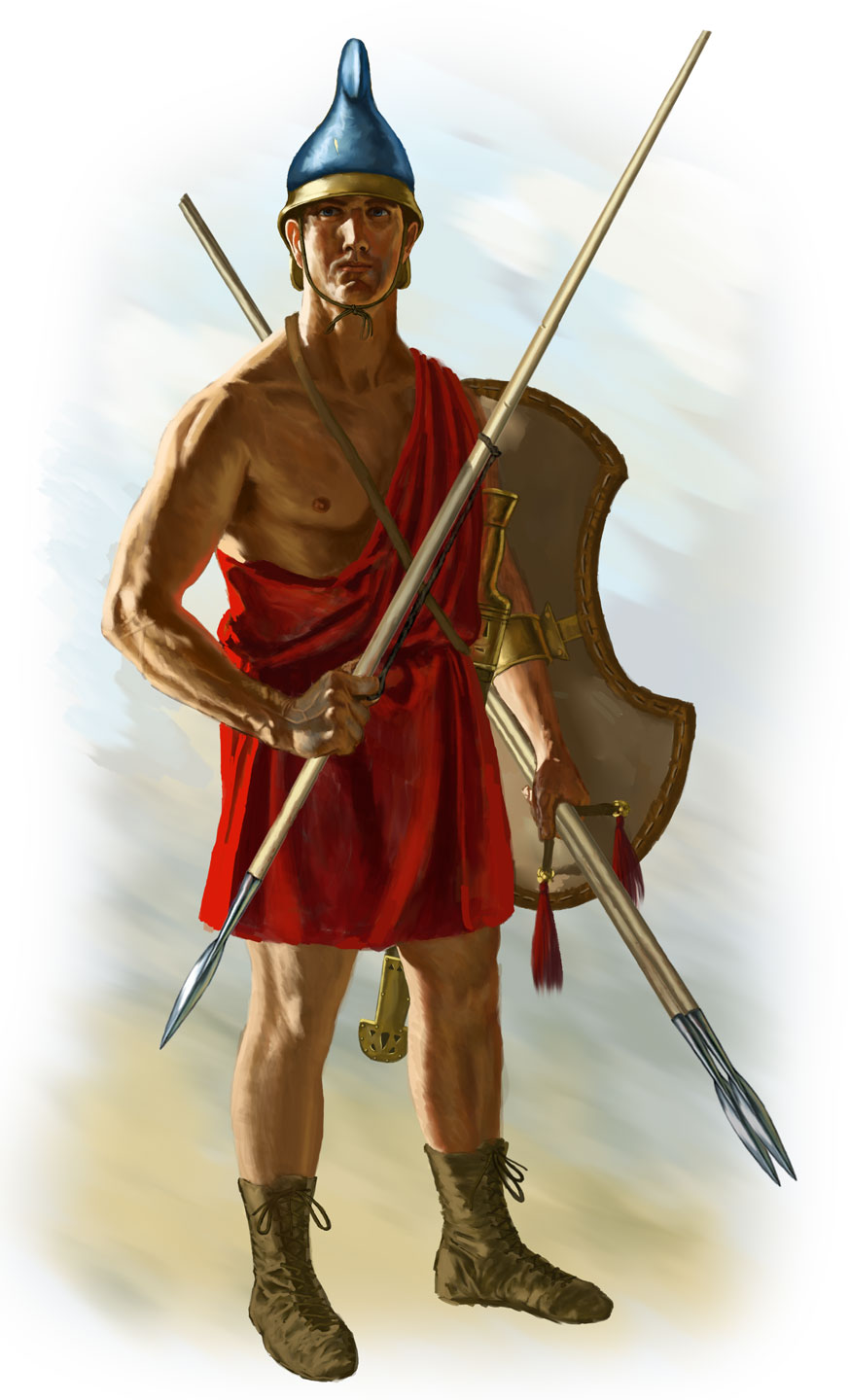
Agrianian peltast - modern reconstruction by Johnny Shumate

The peltasts raised from the Agrianes, a Paeonian tribe, were the elite light infantry of the Macedonian army. They were often used to cover the right flank of the army in battle, being posted to the right of the Companion cavalry, a position of considerable honour. They were almost invariably part of any force on detached duty, especially missions requiring speed of movement. Other nationalities also provided peltasts for the Macedonian army. Especially numerous were the Thracians; the Thracian peltasts performed the same function in battle as the Agrianians, but for the left wing of the army. It is unclear if the Thracians, Paeonians, and Illyrians fighting as javelin throwers, slingers, and archers serving in Macedonian armies from the reign of Philip II onward were conscripted as allies via a treaty or were simply hired mercenaries.

Peltasts were armed with a number of javelins and a sword, carried a light shield but wore no armour, though they sometimes had helmets; they were adept at skirmishing and were often used to guard the flanks of more heavily equipped infantry. They usually adopted an open order when facing enemy heavy infantry. They could throw their javelins at will at the enemy and, unencumbered by armour or heavy shields, easily evade any counter-charges made by heavily equipped hoplites. They were, however, quite vulnerable to shock-capable cavalry and often operated to particular advantage on broken ground where cavalry was useless and heavy infantry found it difficult to maintain formation.

==== Archers ====
Philip II was also able to field archers, including mercenary Cretan archers and perhaps some native Macedonians. In most Greek states, archery was not greatly esteemed, nor practised by native soldiery, and foreign archers were often employed, such as the Scythians prominent in Athenian employ. However, Crete was notable for its very effective archers, whose services as mercenaries were in great demand throughout the Greek world. Cretan archers were famed for their powerful bows, firing arrows with large, heavy heads of cast bronze. They carried their arrows in a quiver with a protective flap over its opening. Cretan archers were unusual in carrying a shield, which was relatively small and faced in bronze. The carrying of shields indicates that the Cretans also had some ability in hand-to-hand fighting, an additional factor in their popularity as mercenaries. Archers were also raised from Macedonia and various Balkan peoples. Alexander inherited the use of Cretan archers from his father's reign, yet around this time a clear reference to the use of native Macedonian archers was made. After the Battle of Gaugamela, archers of West Asian backgrounds became commonplace and were organized into chiliarchies.

== The use of Asiatic soldiers under Alexander the Great ==
According to Arrian, Alexander used Arachosian, Bactrian, Parapamisadaean, Sogdian, Indian, and Scythian troops. They were present at the grand army review Alexander assembled in 324 BC. Alexander was said to have been impressed by the drill of the 30,000 Persians who had been trained in the methods of the Macedonian phalanx. The army supposedly reached 120,000 front-line troops at one point. This did not include camp followers. There has been considerable debate as to when Alexander first used Orientals on active service with the army. During his campaign in Asia against the Persian Empire he formed a hipparchia (i.e. unit of a few hundred horsemen) of companion cavalry composed entirely of ethnic Persians. The introduction of Asiatic troops into the army was actively resented by many of the native Macedonians, especially when the cadre of young Persians from aristocratic families was trained in Macedonian fighting techniques and enrolled in the companion cavalry. Alexander's reaction was to make plans to rule Asia with a locally recruited army, but his death intervened before he could carry out this plan. His successors reversed his aim of diversifying the army and recruited Greeks and Macedonians almost exclusively.

== Arms and armour ==
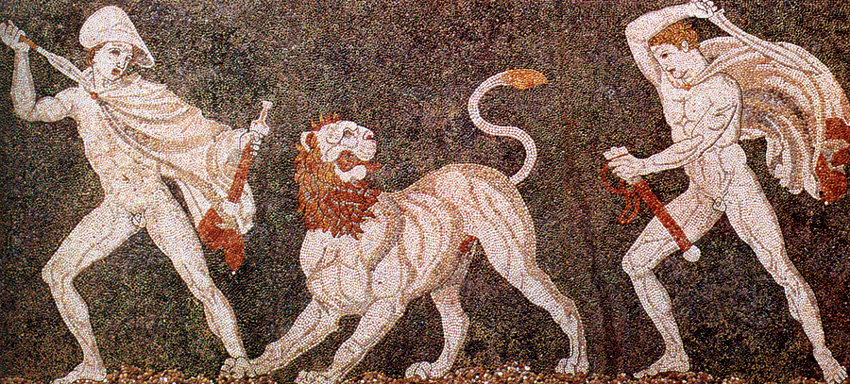
The hunter on the right is wielding a kopis cutting sword, the hunter on the left holds a scabbarded xiphos straight sword. Both types of sword were used by Macedonian cavalry and infantry. Lion Hunt mosaic from the Macedonian capital Pella, late 4th century BC.

Philip II's phalangite infantry were equipped with a 'proto-Telamon shield' that already diverged from the Argive style shield featured in sculpted artwork of a Katerini tomb, dated perhaps to the reign of Amyntas III of Macedon. His early infantry were also equipped with protective helmets and greaves, as well as sarissa (pikes), yet according to Sekunda they were eventually equipped with heavier armour such as cuirasses, since the Third Philippic of Demosthenes in 341 BC described them as hoplites instead of lighter peltasts. As evidenced by the Alexander Sarcophagus, troops serving Alexander the Great were also armoured in the hoplite fashion. However, Errington argues that breastplates were not worn by the phalanx pikemen of either Philip II or Philip V's reign periods (during which sufficient evidence exists). Instead, he claims that breastplates were only worn by military officers, while pikemen wore the kotthybos along with their helmets and greaves, wielding a dagger as a secondary weapon along with their shields.

There is a considerable body of evidence to suggest that the different classes of Macedonian soldier trained to use a variety of arms and equipment. Certainly, cavalry, including Alexander himself, fought on foot during sieges and assaults on fortified settlements, phalangites are described using javelins and some infantrymen were trained to ride horses. The deployment of differing types of armour and weapons was dependent solely on the requirements of a particular tactical situation.

=== Weapons ===
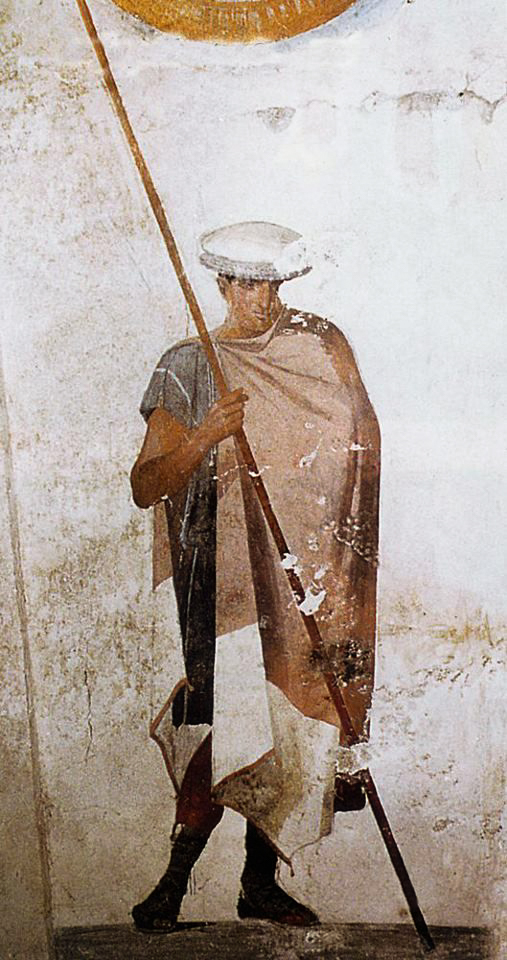
Fresco of an ancient Macedonian soldier with a grounded spear. He wears three items of clothing, which, in combination, are considered typical of Macedonians: The kausia cap, the Macedonian type of chlamys (cloak) and krepides (boots), from the tomb of Agios Athanasios, Thessaloniki, Greece.

Most troops would have carried a type of sword as a secondary weapon. The straight-bladed shortsword known as the xiphos (ξίφος) is depicted in works of art, and two types of single-edged cutting swords, the kopis and machaira, are shown in images and are mentioned in texts. An archaeological find of a well-preserved Macedonian xiphos revealed a sword with a blade length of 55 cm (22 in) and a weight of 300 g (11 oz). The cutting swords are particularly associated with cavalry use, especially by Xenophon, but pictorial representations would suggest that all three sword types were used by cavalry and infantry without obvious distinction.

Each Companion cavalryman was equipped with a 3 m (9.8 ft) double-ended spear with a cornel wood shaft called the xyston. The double spear points meant that, should the xyston break during a battle, the rider need only turn his weapon around to re-arm himself. The Thessalian and Greek cavalry would have been armed similarly to the Companions. The xyston was used to thrust either overarm or underarm with the elbow flexed. This is usefully illustrated in the Alexander Mosaic, King Alexander is shown thrusting with his xyston underarm, whilst immediately behind him a cavalryman is employing the overarm thrust. There is no evidence that the Macedonian cavalry ever used a two-handed grip on their lances, as did later Sarmatian and Roman lancers. The shaft of the xyston was tapered allowing the point of balance, and therefore the hand grip, to be approximately two thirds of the length of the spear away from the point.

The armament of the phalangites is described in the Military Decree of Amphipolis. It lists the fines imposed upon the soldiers who fail to maintain their armament or produce it upon demand. Offensive weapons were a pike (sarissa), and a short sword (machaira). The sarissa was over 6 m (20 ft) in length, with a leaf-shaped iron spearhead, the opposite end featured a flanged bronze counterweight and spike, called a sauroter. Archaeological evidence suggests that the sarissa had an iron sleeve in the middle which may mean that it was in two pieces for the march with the sleeve joining the two sections before use. Like the xyston, the sarissa was greatly tapered towards the point. This, along with the sauroter, helped to make the point of balance as far towards the butt of the weapon as possible. It should be stressed that the archaeological discoveries show that the phalangites also used the two-edged sword (xiphos) as well as the traditional Greek hoplite spear (doru/δόρυ), which was much shorter than the sarissa. The sources also indicate that the phalangites were on occasion armed with javelins. The sarissa would have been useless in siege warfare and other combat situations requiring a less cumbersome weapon.

Hypaspists and allied and mercenary Greek heavy infantry were equipped as classic hoplites and would have employed the hoplite spear and a sword.

Light troops were provided by a number of subject and allied peoples. Various Balkan peoples, such as Agrianes, Paeonians and Thracians, provided either light infantry or cavalry or indeed both. Typical light infantry peltasts would be armed with a number of javelins. The individual javelin would have a throwing thong attached to the shaft behind its point of balance. The thong was wound around the shaft and hooked over one or two fingers. The thong made the javelin spin in flight, which improved accuracy, and the extra leverage increased the power of the throw and the range achievable.

Foot archers, notably mercenary Cretans, were also employed; Cretans were noted for the heavy, large-headed arrows they used. Light cavalry could use lighter types of lance, javelins and, in the case of Iranian horse archers, compact composite bows.

=== Helmets ===
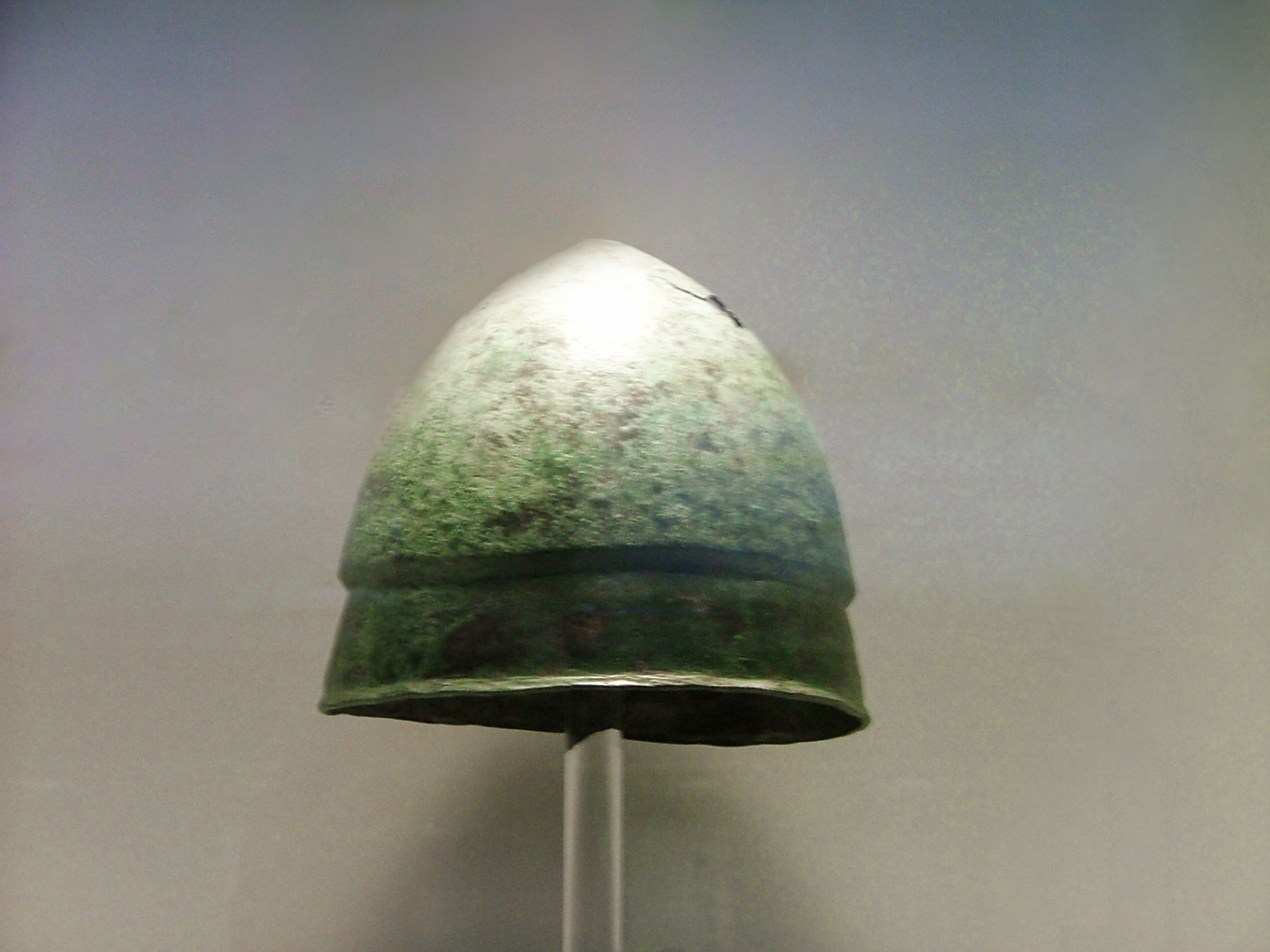
A simple conical helmet (pilos) of a type worn by some Macedonian infantrymen.

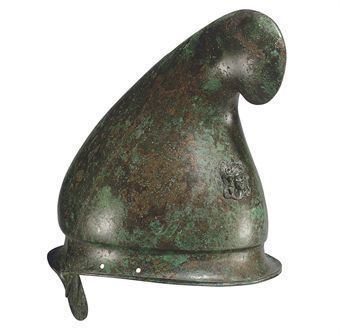
A Thracian helmet. It lacks its cheek pieces.

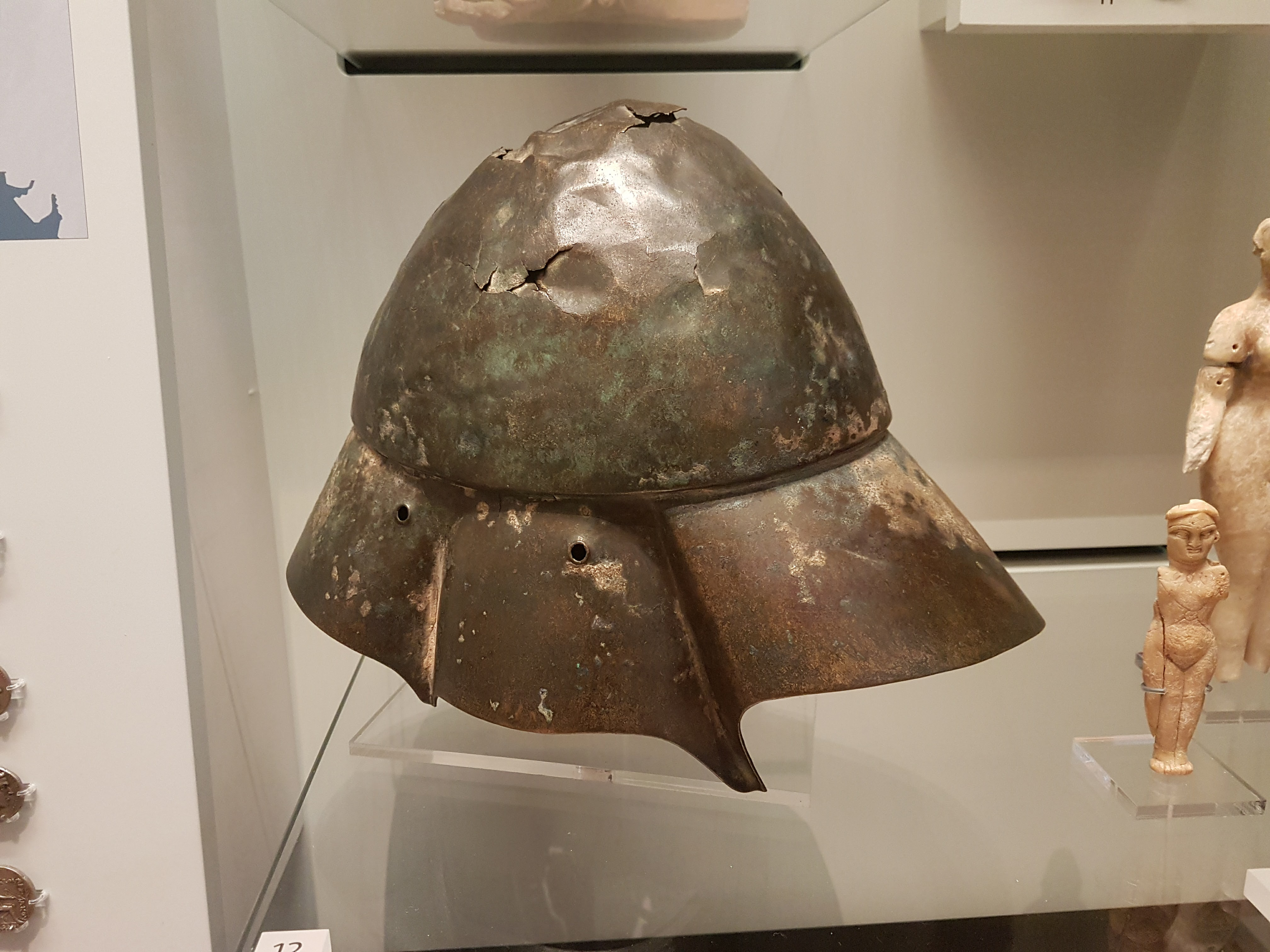
Boeotian bronze helmet, the front of the helmet is to the right

Virtually all helmets in use in the Greek world of the period were constructed of bronze. One helmet prominent in contemporary images was in the form of a Phrygian cap, that is it had a high and forward-projecting apex, this type of helmet, also known as a "Thracian helmet", had a projecting peak above the eyes and usually had large cheek pieces which were often decorated with stylised beards in embossing. Late versions of the Chalcidian helmet were still in use; this helmet was a lightened form developed from the Corinthian helmet, it had a nasal protection and modest-sized cheek pieces. Other, more simple, helmets of the conical 'konos' or 'Pilos type', without cheek pieces, were also employed. These helmets were worn by the heavy infantry.

The Thracian helmet was worn by Macedonian cavalry in King Philip's day, but his son Alexander is said to have preferred the open-faced Boeotian helmet for his cavalry, as recommended by Xenophon. The royal burial in the Vergina Tomb contained a helmet which was a variation on the Thracian/Phrygian type, exceptionally made of iron, this would support its use by cavalry. Additionally, a fresco depicting a Macedonian mounted lancer spearing an infantryman, from the Kinch Tomb, near Naousa, shows the cavalryman wearing a Thracian type helmet. The Boeotian helmet, though it did not have cheek pieces, had a flaring rim which was folded into a complex shape offering considerable protection to the face. The Alexander Mosaic suggests that officers of the heavy cavalry had rank badges in the form of laurel wreaths (perhaps painted or constructed from metal foil) on their helmets.

The Alexander Sarcophagus shows Alexander the Great wearing an elaborate helmet in the form of the lion scalp of Herakles. Alexander's cousin Pyrrhus of Epirus is described as wearing a helmet with cheek pieces in the shape of ram's heads. Many examples of helmets from the period have crest or plume-holders attached, so that a high degree of martial finery could be achieved by the wearing of imposing headpieces.

=== Body armour ===
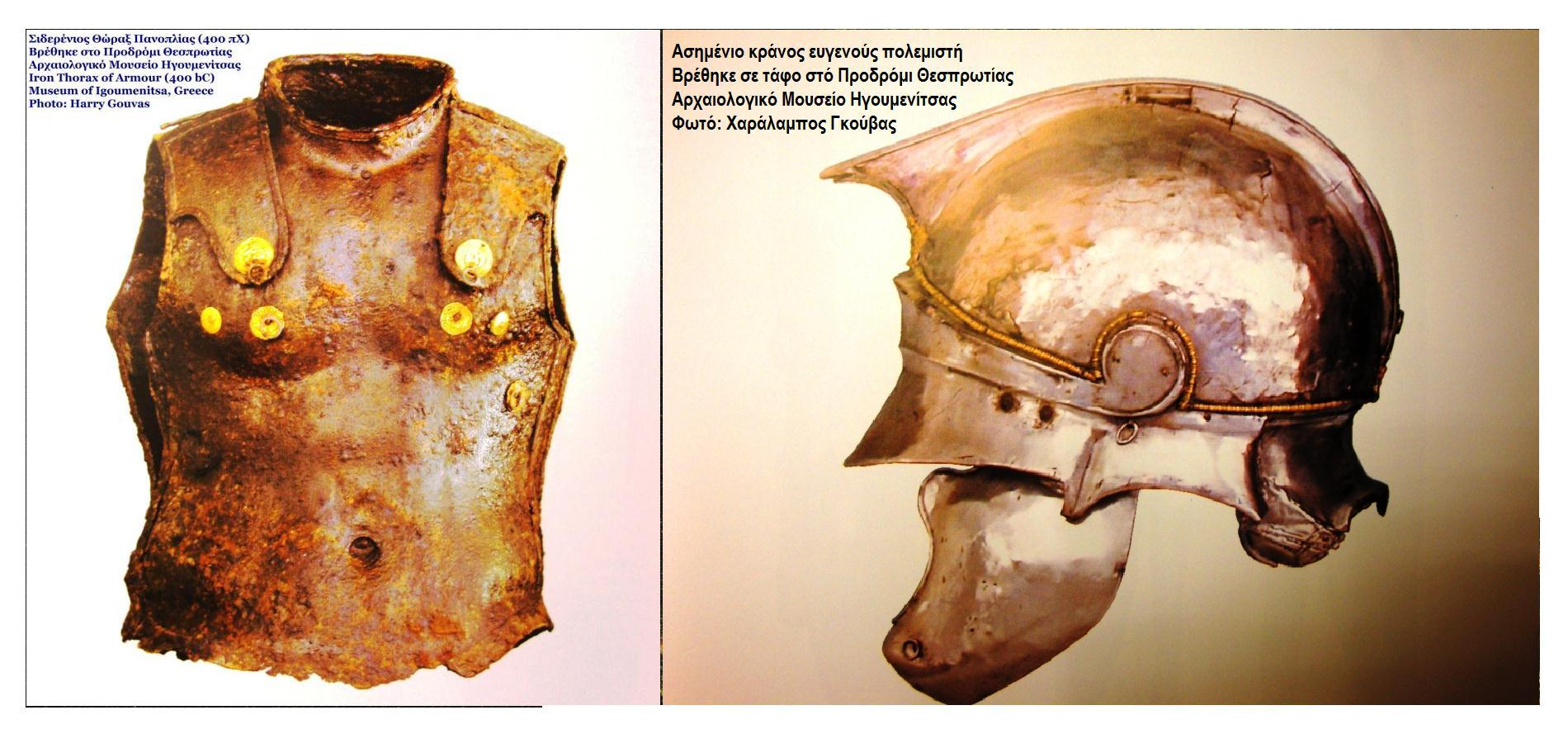
Hellenistic muscle cuirass and a helmet derived from the Thracian/Phrygian type, combined with elements of the Boeotian type

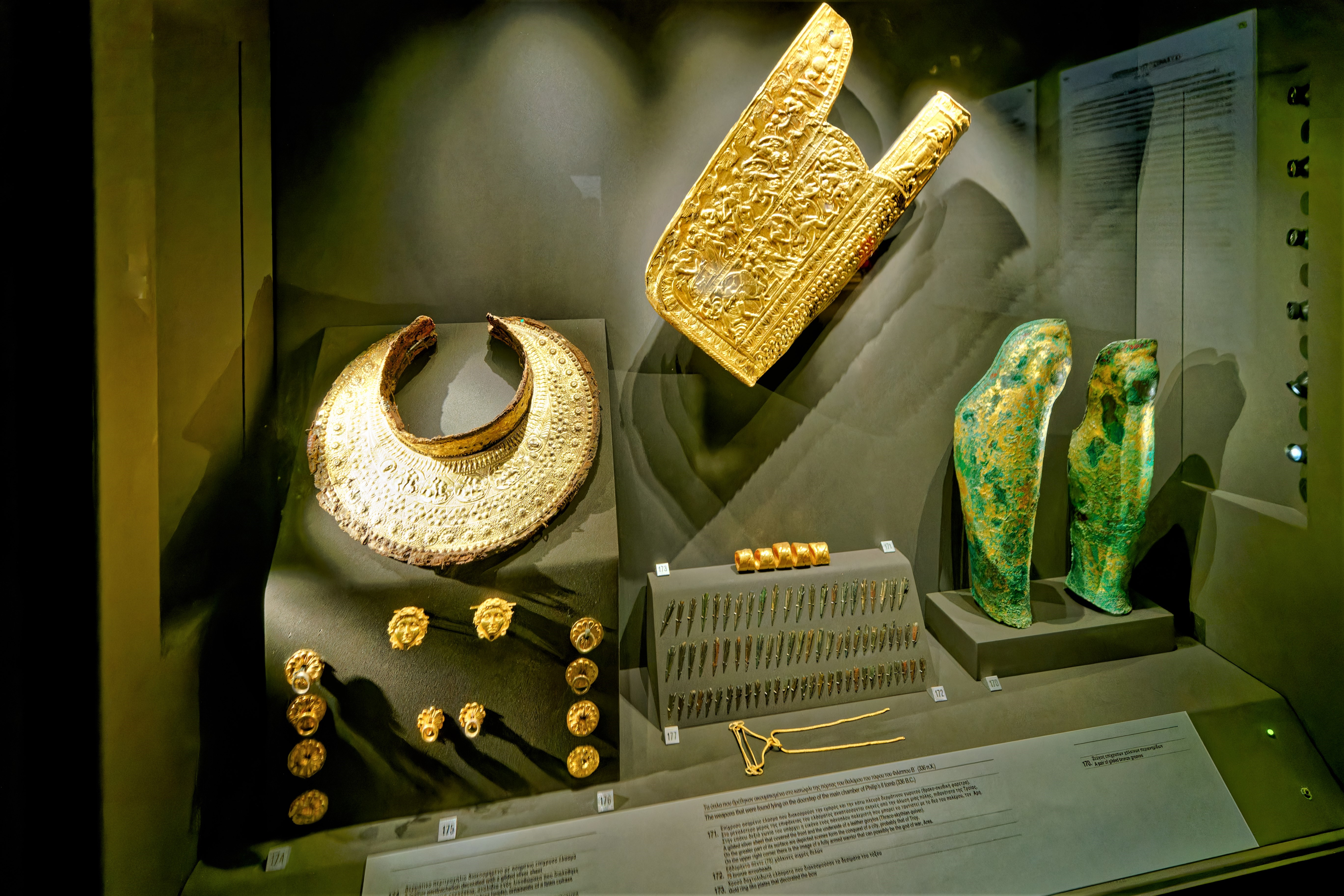
Vergina royal Macedonian tomb, left gold-decorated plate iron gorget, right bronze greaves

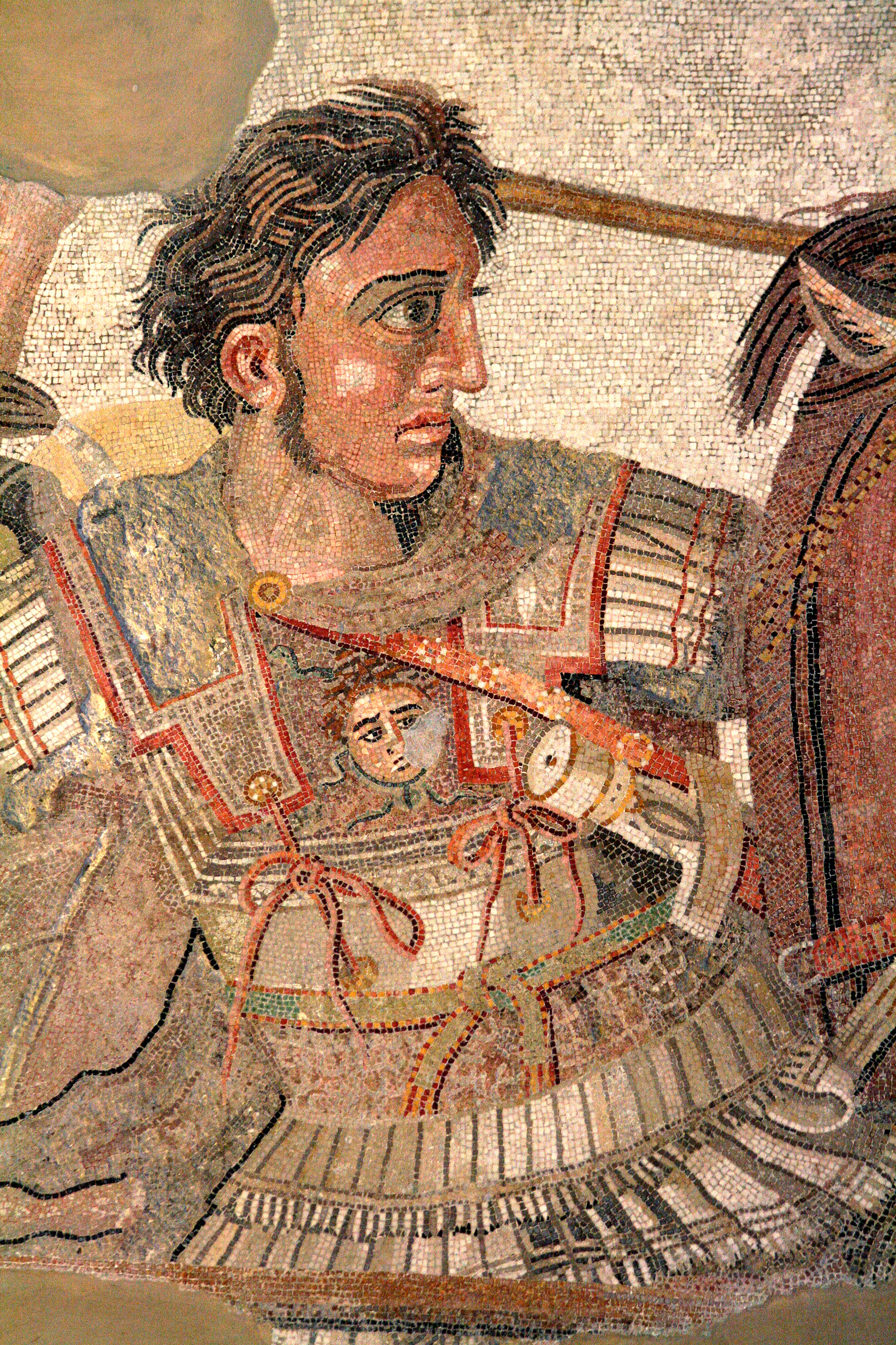
Alexander the Great in battle. The king wears a composite cuirass, which is a reinforced linothorax. The shoulder elements and upper chest are of plate iron, whilst the waist is composed of scale armour for ease of movement. There are pteruges of leather or stiffened linen at the shoulders and hips. The king wears a xiphos sword. Detail of the Alexander Mosaic (A Roman copy of a Hellenistic painting).

Body armour in the Macedonian army was derived from a repertoire found throughout the Greek-speaking world. The most common form of armour was the spolas or linothorax, which was a cuirass of stiff linen built up of glued or stitched layers of textile; though it is possible that linen was used as a facing material over leather. It was composed of the 'girdle' a tubular section, often of four vertical panels, that enclosed the torso. A shoulder-piece was attached to the upper rear section of the girdle, this element was split into two wings which were pulled forward over the top of each shoulder and laced to the chest-section of the girdle. Ancient representations show the shoulder pieces standing vertical when not laced down to the chest of the corselet. This suggests that the linothorax as a whole was very stiff and inflexible. Pteruges, strips of linen or leather, protected the upper arms and hips of the wearer. The linothorax could be reinforced with plate bronze or bronze scale elements. Defences of a similar appearance composed of quilted textile are also described.

Less common, due to its expense, was the muscle cuirass. This was a defence made entirely of plate bronze consisting of a breast and backplate, usually with shoulder pieces, modelled in relief on the form a muscular male torso. This was often given pteruges to extend the area of the body covered.

A complete cuirass of plate iron, decorated with gold and modelled on the form of the linothorax, was discovered in the Macedonian royal burial at Vergina, together with a plate iron gorget. This, alongside the evidence of the depiction of Alexander the Great in the Alexander Mosaic, shows that the technology to make plate armour in iron existed at this time. It is to be doubted that this type of armour was worn by persons other than of royal or very exalted rank. At the Battle of Granicus, Alexander the Great's cuirass was pierced at a joint, by a javelin. Such joints are found connecting the plates of the iron Vergina cuirass, suggesting that Alexander was wearing an armour of similar construction. At the Battle of Gaugamela, Plutarch describes Alexander wearing an iron helmet and gorget polished to look like silver.

All of the above forms of armour could be described as thorakes (plural of thorax). Other forms of armour are mentioned in original sources, such as the kotthybos and a type of "half-armour" the hemithorakion (ἡμιθωράκιον); the precise nature of these defences is not known but it would be reasonable to conclude that they were lighter and perhaps afforded less protection than the thorax. However, it has been suggested that when the terms kotthybos, hemithorakion and thorax occur together, as in the Amphipolis regulation, then thorax may refer specifically to the bronze muscle cuirass. Within the phalanx the thorax and hemithorakion were reserved for hegemones, the officers. It has also been proposed that the kotthybos might refer to a form of linothorax. It is recorded that Alexander ordered the burning of old armours, which suggests that the armour in question was non-metallic.

Archaeological remains exist for only one type of limb armour: bronze greaves, which protected the lower leg. Greaves could be worn by both heavy infantry and heavy cavalry, but they are not in great evidence in contemporary depictions. However, greaves are mentioned in the Military Decree of Amphipolis and a pair of greaves, one shorter than the other, were found in the Vergina Tomb.

Xenophon mentions a type of armour called "the hand" (χεῖρα) to protect the left, bridle, arm of heavy cavalrymen, though there is no supporting evidence for its widespread use. It may have resembled the later manica armour used by Roman gladiators and cataphract cavalry.

=== Shields ===
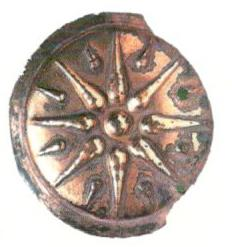
An image depicting an ancient Macedonian shield displaying the 'Vergina Sun', a royal symbol. Excavated at Bonče, North Macedonia.

The Macedonian phalangite shield, also termed the 'Telamon shield', was circular and displayed a slight convexity; its outer surface was faced by a thin bronze sheet. The inner face of the shield was of wood or a multilayered leather construction, with a band for the forearm fixed to the centre of the shield. Plutarch noted that the phalangites (phalanx soldiers) carried a small shield on their shoulder. This probably meant that, as both hands were needed to hold the sarissa, the shield was worn suspended by a shoulder strap and steadied by the left forearm passing through the armband. The left hand would project beyond the rim of the shield to grip the sarissa. Recent reconstructions of the sarissa and phalangite shield showed that the shoulder strap supporting the shield effectively helps to transfer some of the weight of the sarissa from the left arm to the shoulders when the sarissa is held horizontally in its fighting position. The Macedonian phalangite shield is described by Asclepiodotus (Tactica, 5) as being eight palms wide (equivalent to 62 cm (24 in)) and "not too hollow".

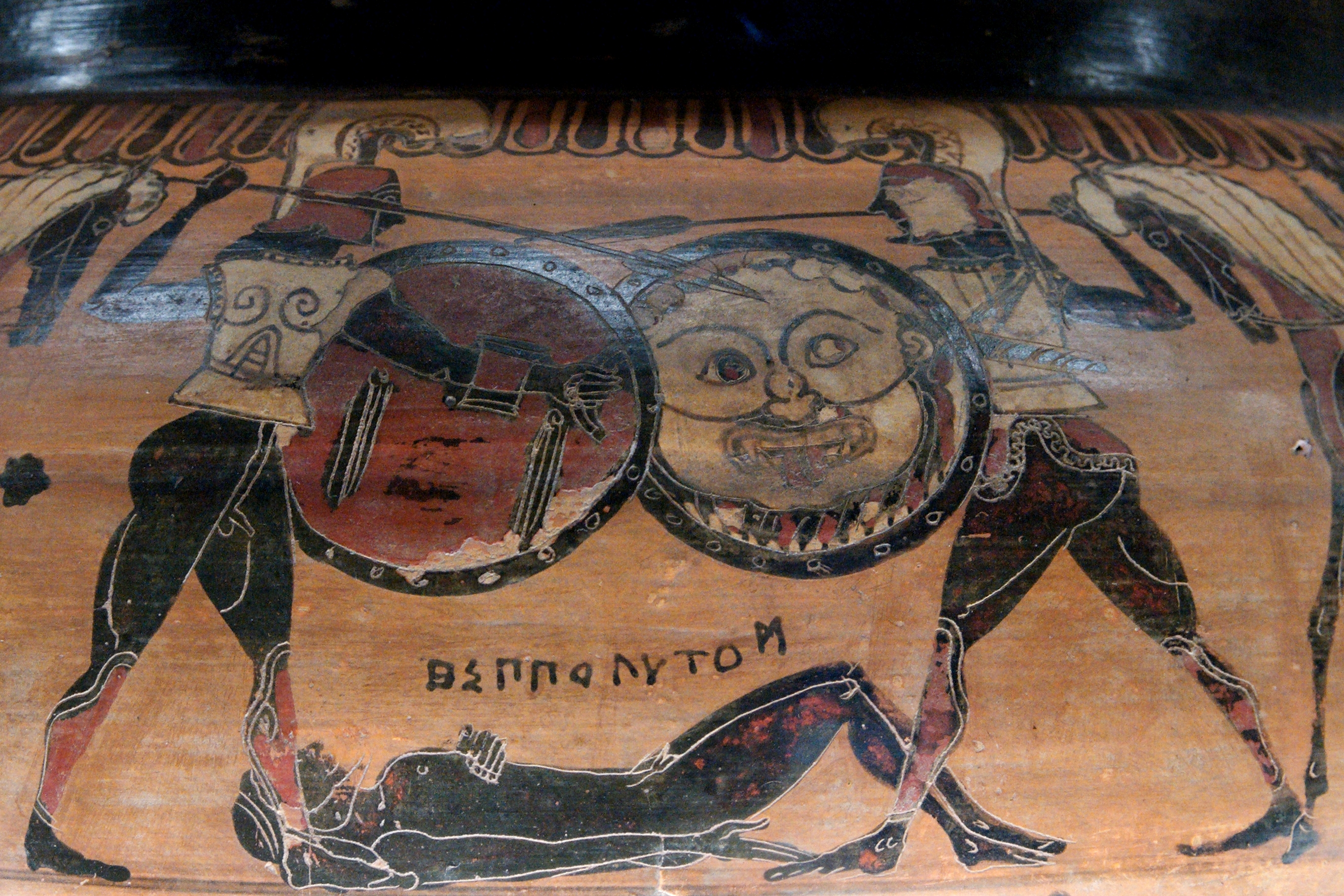
The lefthand figure shows the armband and grip on the inside of an Argive shield; painted Corinthian krater c. 560 BC.

From pictorial sources, it is probable that the Hypaspists, elite members of the infantry, including the Agema of the King's personal foot guard, employed a shield of larger dimensions, the traditional Greek hoplite shield often called the aspis (ἀσπίς), though this was a general term for any shield, it is more properly referred to as the 'Argive shield'. This shield, also circular, was larger than the phalangite shield, it had sheet-bronze facing over a wooden base; it was held with the left forearm passing through a central armband with a hand-grip set just inside the rim. This shield was much more convex than the phalangite shield and had a projecting rim, both features precluding its use with a double handed pike. The style of shield used by cavalry, if any, is less clear; the heavy cavalry of Alexander's time did not employ shields.

Light infantry javelineers would have used a version of the pelte (Ancient Greek: πέλτη) shield, from whence their name, peltast, derived. This was a light shield made of leather-faced wicker. The shield was of Thracian origin and was originally crescent-shaped, however, by the time of Macedonian greatness many depictions of peltai show them as being oval or round.

== Siege warfare ==
The Macedonians had developed their siege tactics under Philip. They had for the first time conducted successful sieges against strongly held and fortified positions. This was a dramatic shift from earlier warfare, where Greek armies had lacked the ability to conduct an effective assault. For instance, during the Peloponnesian War, the Spartans were never able to take Athens despite easily conquering her surrounding territory. For the task of breaching the walled fortifications of cities, Philip II hired engineers such as Polyidus of Thessaly and Diades of Pella, who were capable of building state of the art siege engines and artillery firing large bolts.

=== Artillery ===
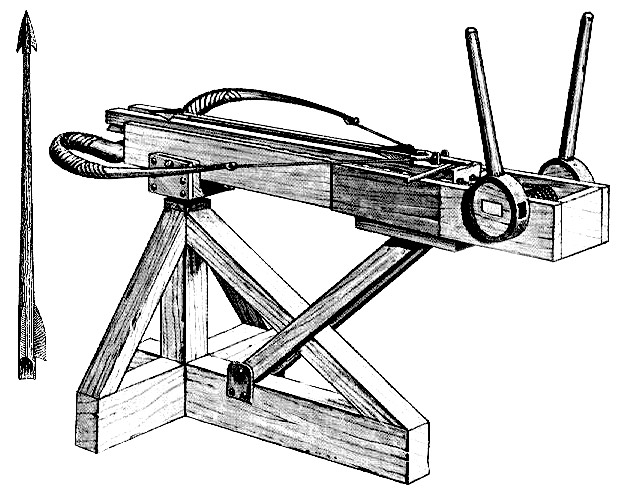
Oxybeles

The dramatic change in the abilities of Greeks to operate against fortifications owed much to the development of effective artillery. This had begun around 400 BC in Syracuse under Dionysius I. By Alexander’s time, torsion-powered artillery was in use. Torsion machines used skeins of sinew or hair rope, which were wound around a frame and twisted so as to power two bow arms; these could develop much greater force than earlier forms (such as the gastraphetes) reliant on the elastic properties of a bow-stave. Two forms of such ballista were used by the Macedonians: a smaller bolt-shooting type called the oxybeles and a larger stone-throwing machine called the lithobolos. The largest lithoboloi could fire stones up to 80 kg (180 lb) in weight. Such machines could shower the defenders of a city with missiles and create a breach in the walls themselves.

Alexander the Great appears to have been one of the first generals to employ artillery on the open field of battle, rather than in a siege. He used massed artillery to fire across a river at a Scythian army, causing it to vacate the opposite river bank, thus allowing the Macedonian troops to cross and form a bridgehead.

=== Other siege engines ===
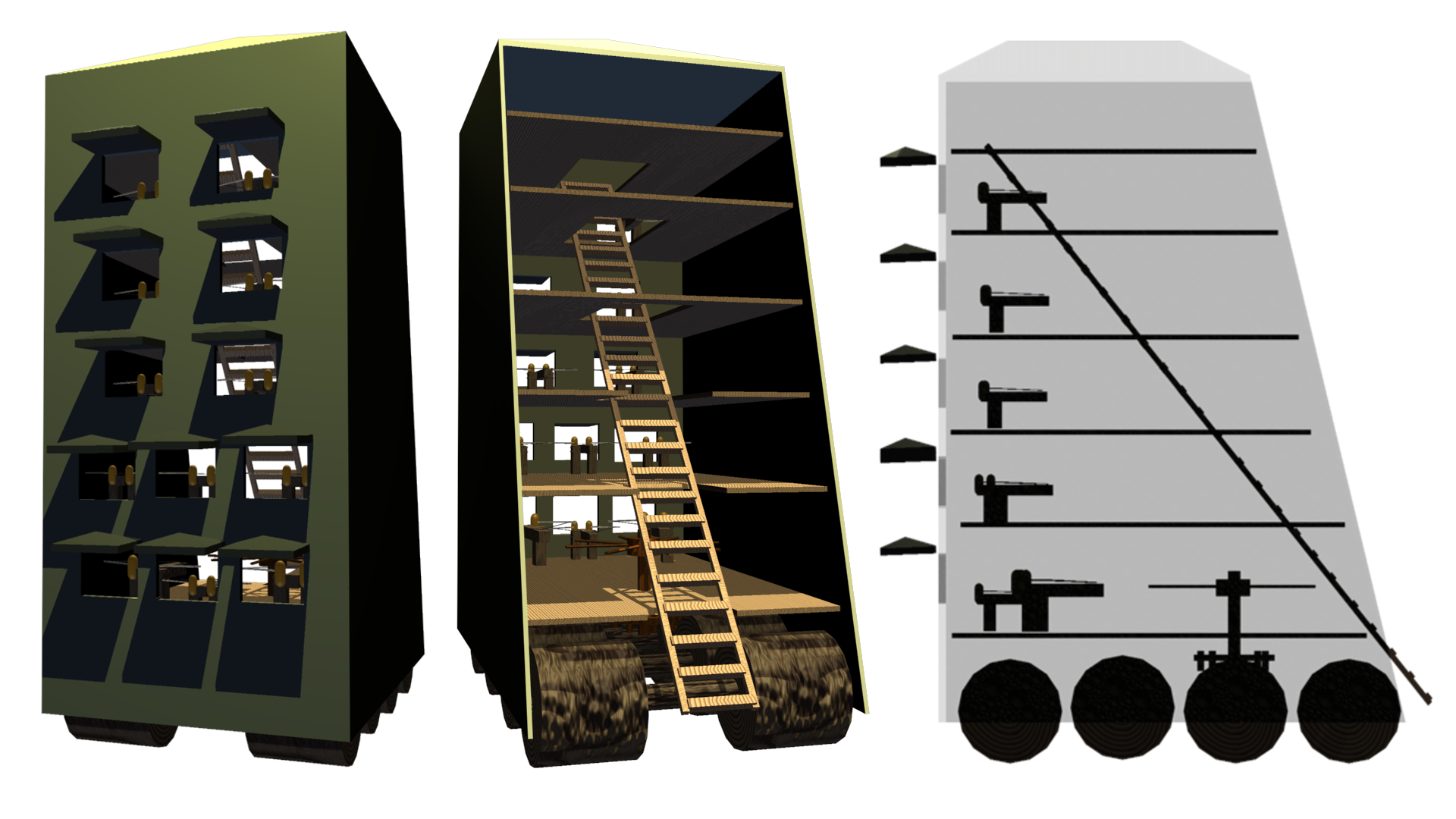
Helepolis siege tower, modern interpretation

In conjunction with various forms of artillery, the Macedonians possessed the ability to build an effective array of siege engines. Prominent in a number of sieges, including the epic Siege of Tyre (332 BC), were siege towers (helepolis); these allowed men to approach and assault the enemy walls without being exposed to potentially withering missile fire. Equally, they meant that more men could be put on the walls in a shorter period of time, as simple ladders constrained the men attacking to moving up in single file, thus making the task of defending the walls far easier. These structures, which were wheeled and several stories high, were covered with wet hide or metal sheathing to protect from missile fire, especially incendiaries, and the largest might be equipped with artillery. The Macedonian army could also deploy various forms of suspended, metal-tipped, rams. Such rams were usually provided with a wheeled, roofed covering to protect their users from missile fire; they were employed to batter down gates or to dislodge masonry from walls and so cause a breach (this latter form was sometimes called a 'drill' rather than a ram).

== Battle tactics ==
A typical Macedonian battle formation.

The Macedonian army was one of the first military forces to use 'combined arms tactics', using a variety of specialised troops to fulfill specific battlefield roles in order to form a greater whole. Although it did not succeed in every battle, the army of Philip II was able to successfully adopt the military tactics of its enemies, such as the embolon (i.e. 'flying wedge') formation of the Scythians. This offered cavalry far greater manoeuvrability and an edge in battle that previously did not exist in the Classical Greek world.

The tactics used by the Macedonian army throughout the various campaigns it fought were, of course, varied; usually in response to the nature of the enemy forces and their dispositions, and to the physical nature of the battlefield. However, there were a number of features of the tactics employed by the Macedonians in pitched battles which can be identified as being typical. These features were evident in the first major battle the army, newly trained up by Philip, fought in 358 BC and could still be discerned at Gaugamela in 331 BC.

The Battle of Erigon Valley fought in 358 BC was intended to free Macedon of the threat from Illyria and recover some western areas of Macedon from Illyrian control. The Illyrians, led by King Bardylis, were at a similar strength to the Macedonians at about 10,000–11,000 troops. Philip had 600 cavalry, the Illyrians were concerned about being outflanked by the Macedonian cavalry and formed up in a hollow square. Philip massed his cavalry on his right flank and arranged his army in echelon, with the left refused. As had been anticipated, the Illyrians stretched their formation in order to bring the Macedonian left wing into action. Philip waited until the inevitable gap appeared in the left of the Illyrian square, then threw his cavalry at the gap. The cavalry forced their way into the Illyrian ranks and were followed by elements of the phalanx. The Illyrians broke after a fierce struggle, and three-quarters of Bardylis' army were slaughtered. The oblique advance with the left refused, the careful manoeuvring to create disruption in the enemy formation and the knock out charge of the strong right wing, spearheaded by the Companion cavalry, became standard Macedonian practice.

== Later developments and decline ==
Following the fragmentation of the empire of Alexander, Macedon became an independent kingdom once again. The military forces of this successor state, the Antigonid Macedonian army, retained many features of the armies of Philip and Alexander. The Hellenistic armies of the other Macedonian successor-states of the Diadochi period, which followed the death of Alexander, also displayed a continuation of earlier Macedonian equipment, organisation and tactics. Pyrrhus of Epirus defeated the Romans, led by Consul Publius Valerius Laevinus, in the Battle of Heraclea in 280 BC, due to his superior cavalry, his elephants and his phalanx. Although the battle was a victory for the Greeks, they incurred severe losses. Towards the end of the Hellenistic period, however, there was a general decline in the use of the combined arms approach, and the phalanx once more became the arm of decision. The phalangites were armed with longer pikes and, as a result, the phalanx itself became less mobile and adaptable than it had been in Alexander's era. Because all the competing Hellenistic armies were employing the same tactics, these weaknesses were not immediately apparent. However, the Hellenistic armies were eventually faced by forces from outside the successor kingdoms, such as the Roman and Parthian armies, composed of differing troop types using novel tactics. Against such foes the Hellenistic-era phalanx proved vulnerable. Antiochus' defeat at Magnesia marked the end of the Macedonian phalanx's dominance on Hellenistic period battlefields. The phalanx finally met its end in the Ancient world when the more flexible Roman manipular tactics contributed to the defeat and partition of Macedon in the 2nd century BC.

== Macedonian Navy ==
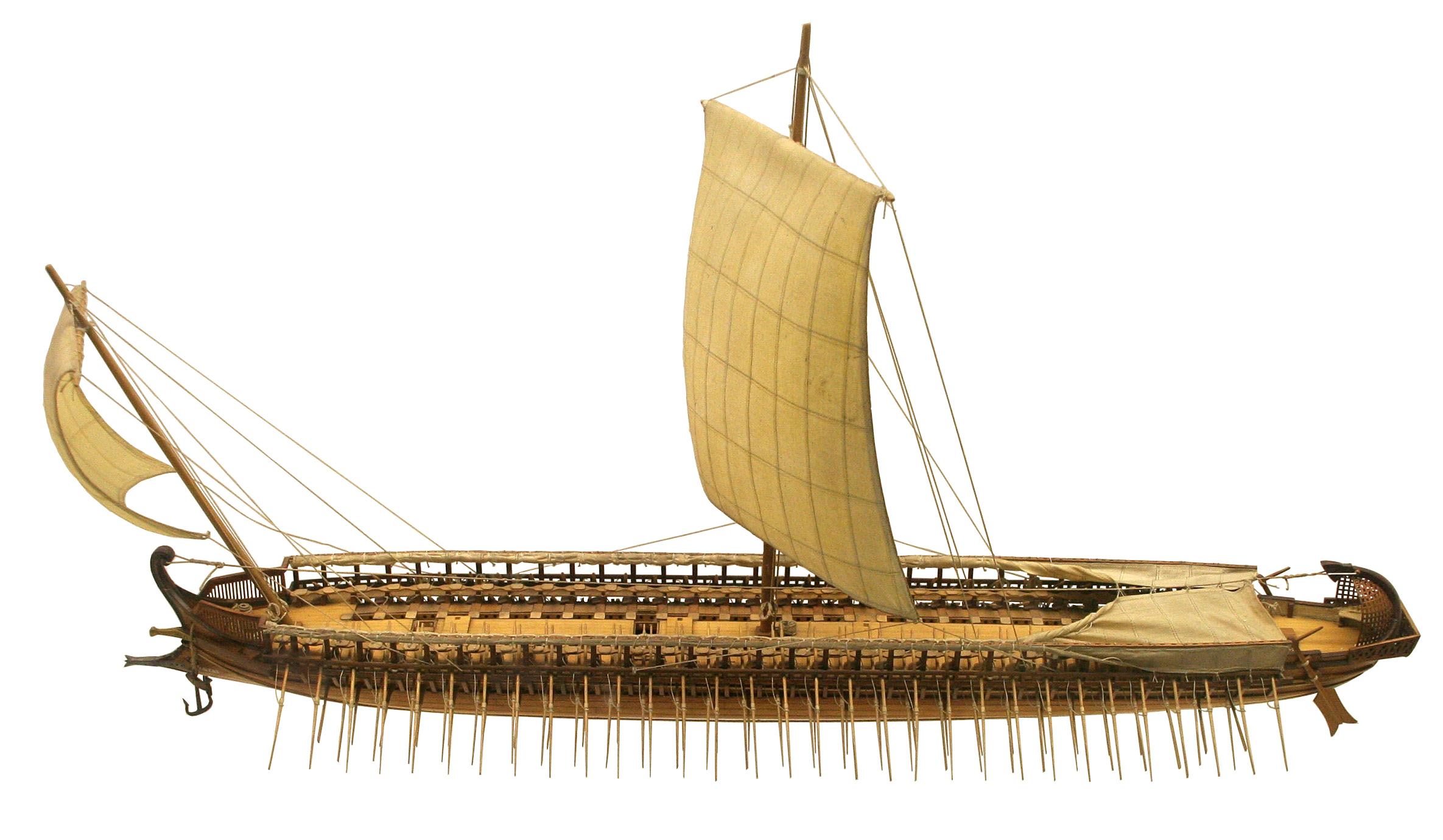
Ancient Greek trireme. Modern model

Macedon was not itself a major naval power even during the reign of Philip II. However, inheriting by Philip the leadership of the Hellenic League and the plan to invade the Persian Empire, Alexander crossed the Hellespont with his army in 334 BC, employing a fleet of 120 ships with crews numbering 38,000 drawn from Macedon and various Greek city states members of the Hellenic League, including the naval powers of Athens and Corinth. The army transported to Anatolia numbered, including the advanced guard, approximately 43,000 foot soldiers and 6,100 cavalry, including Macedonians, contingents provided by the states in the League of Corinth, Greek mercenaries and tribal soldiers from Thrace, Paionia, and Illyria. It took over one hundred triremes (triple-banked galleys) to transport the entire Macedonian army, largely provided by the League of Corinth, but the Persians decided not to actively oppose the movement.

In 332 BC, Alexander laid siege to the Phoenician city of Tyre, located on a heavily fortified island just off the coast of the Levant. Tyre did not fully submit to his control; he could not leave this powerful port-city in his rear as he moved towards Egypt. As the Tyrian fleet greatly outnumbered the ships available to the Macedonians, Alexander was forced to build a causeway out to the island of Tyre from the mainland to enable his forces to attack. Tyrian defence proved to be a match to Alexander's ingenuity in building the causeway and the siege became a stalemate. Fortunately for Alexander, his previous victory at Issus and subsequent conquests of the Phoenician city states of Byblos, Arwad and Sidon had meant that the fleets of these cities, which had composed most of the Persian navy, came under his control. This immediately gave him command of a fleet of 80 ships. This development coincided also with the arrival of 120 war galleys sent by the city-kingdoms of Cyprus, who were aware of the shift of power in the region from the Persian king to Alexander. With the arrival of another 23 ships from the Greek city states of Ionia, Alexander had 223 galleys under his command, giving him command of the sea. Along with the navy he broadened the width of his mole to allow for more defensive artillery to provide protection from those of the Tyrians. The first attested appearance of Quadriremes is at the Siege of Tyre by Alexander the Great in 332 BC.

With his new fleet, Alexander blockaded both of the Tyrian harbours with its superior numbers. Alexander had several of the slower galleys and a few barges lashed together in pairs and had these floating platforms equipped with battering rams and also embarked large stone-shooting catapults (lithoboloi) on other vessels. Finding that large underwater blocks of stone kept the rams from reaching the walls, Alexander had them removed by crane ships. The rams were then anchored near the walls, but the Tyrians sent out ships and divers to cut the anchor cables. Alexander responded by replacing the cables with chains. The ram and catapult fitted ships created a breach in the southern walls of Tyre and Macedonian troops, spearheaded by the hypaspists, stormed the city. In 326 BC, Nearchus was made admiral of the fleet that Alexander had constructed at the Hydaspes (A 6.2.3; Indica 18.10).

During the Lamian War, after the death of Alexander, the Macedonian empire's navy defeated the fleets of Athens.

== Major battles and campaigns ==
- Expansion of Macedonia under Philip II
- Battle of Erigon Valley (358 BC)
- Battle of Crocus Field (353/352 BC)
- Battle of Chaeronea (338 BC)
- Wars of Alexander the Great
- Alexander's Balkan campaign
- Battle of the Granicus (334 BC)
- Battle of Issus (333 BC)
- Siege of Tyre (332 BC)
- Siege of Gaza (332 BC)
- Battle of Gaugamela (331 BC)
- Battle of Megalopolis (331 BC)
- Battle of Jaxartes (329 BC)
- Battle of the Hydaspes (326 BC)
- Alexander's Indian campaign

== See also ==
- List of Macedonian military personnel
- Military tactics of Alexander the Great
- Spartan army
- Athenian navy
- Theban army
- Hellenistic armies
- Seleucid army
- Ptolemaic navy
- Roman army
