= Military Decree of Amphipolis =

The Military Decree of Amphipolis (c. 200 BC) is a Macedonian Greek inscription of two marble blocks, that originally contain at least three columns of text. It preserves a list of regulations governing the behaviour and discipline of the Macedonian army in camp.

τοὺς μὴ φέροντας τι τῶν καθηκόντων αὐτοῖς ὅπλων ζημιούτωσαν κατά τα γεγραμμένα· κοτθύβου ὀβολοὺς δύο, κώνου τὸ ἴσον, σαρίσης ὀβολοὺς τρεῖς, μαχαίρας τὸ ἴσον, κνημίδων ὀβολοὺς δύο, ἀσπίδος δραχμήν. Ἑπὶ δὲ τῶν ἡγεμόνων τῶν τε δεδηλωμένων ὅπλων τὸ διπλοῦν καὶ θώρακος δραχμὰς δύο, ἡμιθωρακίου δραχμήν. Λαμβανέτωσαν δὲ τὴν ζημίαν οἱ γραμματεῖς καὶ οἱ ἀρχυ[πηρέτ]αι, παραδείξαντες τῶι βασιλεῖ τοὺς ἠθετηκότας

those not bearing the weapons appropriate to them are to be fined according to the regulations: for the kotthybos, two obols, the same amount for the konos, three obols for the sarissa, the same for the makhaira, for the knemides two obols, for the aspis a drachma. In the case of hegemons (officers), double for the arms mentioned, two drachmas for the thorax, a drachma for the hemithorakion. The secretaries (grammateis) and the chief assistants (archyperetai) shall exact the penalty, after indicating the transgressors to the King (basileus)

Other military terms mentioned are: ephodos (inspection patrol), ekkoition ("out-of-bed", LSJ: night-watch), stegnopoiia (building the barracks), skenopoiia (tent-making), phragmos (fencing in), diastasis, phylax (guard), hypaspists, parembole, stratopedon (camp), speirarch (commander of a speira), tetrarch, and the strategoi.

== See also ==
- Antigonid Macedonian army
