= Konos =

Macedonian helmet

Konos (Ancient Greek: κῶνος: cone, spinning top) is a conical Macedonian helmet worn in combat during the Hellenistic era. Its pointed shape is similar to the pilos helmet that is placed underneath a konos as an interior protector. Although close in design, a pilos helmet has a small visor around the opening and a konos helmet is created to have a thin brim protruding from its base and closely fits around the warrior's head. Bronze ear guards that hang to the jawbone were later added for further protection, also differing from the pilos. Spiral characteristics from the Ionic order are engraved across the front of the helmet for design. The Greek crest is fixed across the ridges of the helmet as a way to demonstrate tribe recognition.

The konos and pilos helmet belong to one of five standard types of ancient Greek headgear and weaponry. A clause of military regulation from Amphipolis proclaims that the konos is to be the helmet of phalangites—infantry standing in close rectangular or squared formation. According to the Military Decree of Amphipolis, "...those not bearing the weapons appropriate to them are to be fined: two obols for the kotthybos, the same amount for the konos, three obols for the sarissa..."

== See also ==
- Kausia
