= Thorax (disambiguation) =

The thorax is the human chest, or division of an animal's body that lies between the head and the abdomen.

Thorax may also refer to:

- The thorax in arthropods, see Thorax (arthropod anatomy)
- Thorax (θώραξ), the Ancient Greek term for cuirass/breastplate
  - Linothorax, Ancient Greek armour composed of linen
  - Thorakitai, Hellenistic soldiers equipped with mail
- Thorax (cockroach), a genus of cockroach

== People ==
- Thorax of Larissa, an ancient Greek noble of the 5th century BC
- Thorax of Lacedaemonia, a Lacedaemonian commander of the late 5th/early 4th century BC
- Thorax, who commissioned the 10th Pythian Ode of Pindar, in which the names of Thorax and his lover Hippocleas are immortalized

== Journal ==
- Thorax (journal), medical journal

== Geography ==
- Thorax (Aetolia), a town of ancient Aetolia, Greece
