= Kotthybos =

Type of ancient Greek body armour

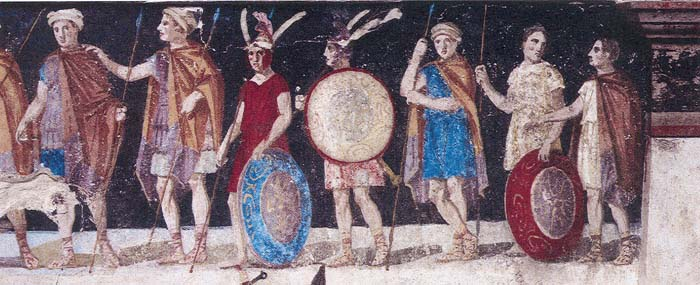
Fresco of Macedonian soldiers, the two on the left wear purple armour with rows of pteruges, possibly depictions of the kotthybos. Tomb of Agios Athanasios, Thessaloniki, Greece, 4th century BC

Kotthybos (Greek: κότθυβος) was a type of Macedonian body armour.

== Etymology ==
The name originally referred to a metallic cooking pot used by ancient Macedonian soldiers to prepare their own food. The term appears to be a variant of terms such as kossymbos and kosymbe.

== Use and possible construction ==
Ancient sources are unclear as to the form of the kotthybos, but the context of references to it indicates that it was a form of armour associated with the 'Foot Companions' (Pezhetairoi) who formed the Macedonian phalanx. It is recorded that the fine of 2 obols imposed on a soldier for losing a kotthybos, was the same as for the konos, a simple, conical, bronze helmet, and less than for the sarissa, a long pike.

Modern scholars are divided as to what the kotthybos was; some consider it a padded garment worn under other forms of armour, whilst the majority regard it an alternative term for the spolas or linothorax (neologism), the typical Hellenic and Hellenistic armour made of glued or stitched layers of linen, or a combination of layers of linen and leather. It is likely that the old armours that Alexander the Great ordered to be burnt, and were therefore non-metallic, were examples of the kotthybos.

== Bibliography ==
- Crawford, M.H, and Whitehead, D. (1983) Archaic and Classical Greece: A Selection of Ancient Sources in Translation, Cambridge University Press.
- Hammond, N.G.l. (1989) Alexander the Great, King, Commander, and Statesman, Bloomsbury Academic. ISBN 1-85399-068-X
- Heckel, W. and Jones, R. (2006) Macedonian Warrior Alexander's elite infantryman, Osprey. ISBN 978-1-84176-950-9
- Matthew, C. (2015) An Invincible Beast: Understanding the Hellenistic Pike Phalanx in Action, Pen and Sword.

== See also ==
- Konos
