= Thorax (Aetolia) =

Thorax (Ancient Greek: Θώραξ) was a town in ancient Aetolia. It was noted by Stephanus of Byzantium.
