= Hemithorakion =

Ancient Greek half-armour

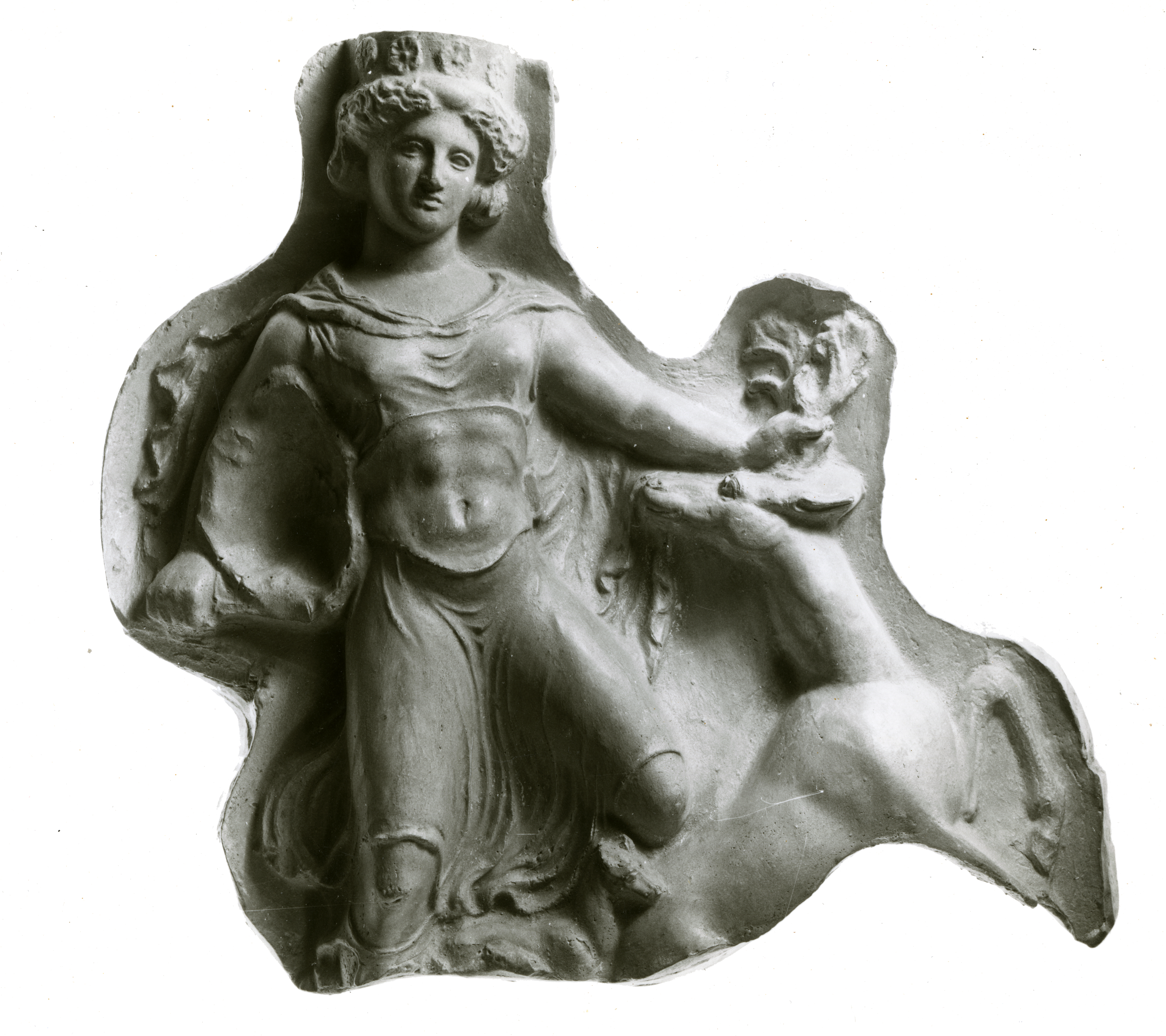
Plaster cast from terracotta mold c. early fourth century BC. A hemithorakion is clearly visible on Artemis' midsection.

Hemithorakion (Greek: ημιθωράκιο) (hemi- thorax) was an ancient Greek half-armour that covered the midriff or abdomen area. The inventor is believed to be the Thessalian ruler Jason of Pherae. It was an equipment of the officers, not of common soldiers. Plutarch records that hemithorakia were worn by Pelopidas and his soldiers during the battle to expel the Spartans from Thebes in 379, a battle in which Pelopidas and his men disguised themselves as women. In art, it is generally seen on female warriors, which corroborates Plutarch's account. Instances in art include several vase depictions on Amazons. An unusual intact terracotta mold from Morgantina, dating from the first half of the fourth century, shows Artemis wearing the hemithorakia while sacrificing a hind.

During Alexander the Great's campaign in the Zagros Mountains (possibly in Sittacene where his army reorganization took place), he is recorded to have ordered his units to use a hemithorakion instead of the usual full torso armor, as emphasis was put into lighter infantry.

== See also ==
- Linothorax
