= Kausia =

Broad-brimmed flat felt hat of Ancient Macedonian origin

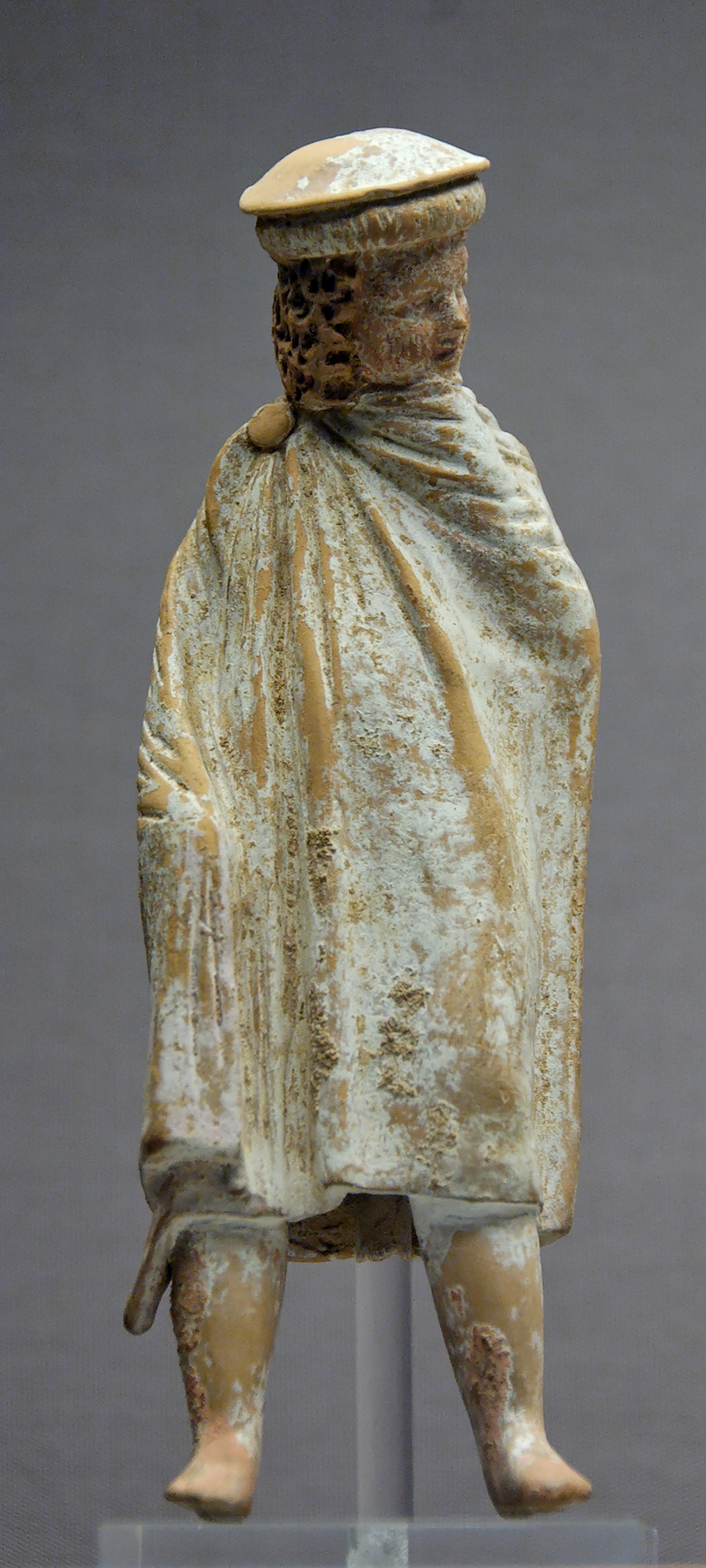
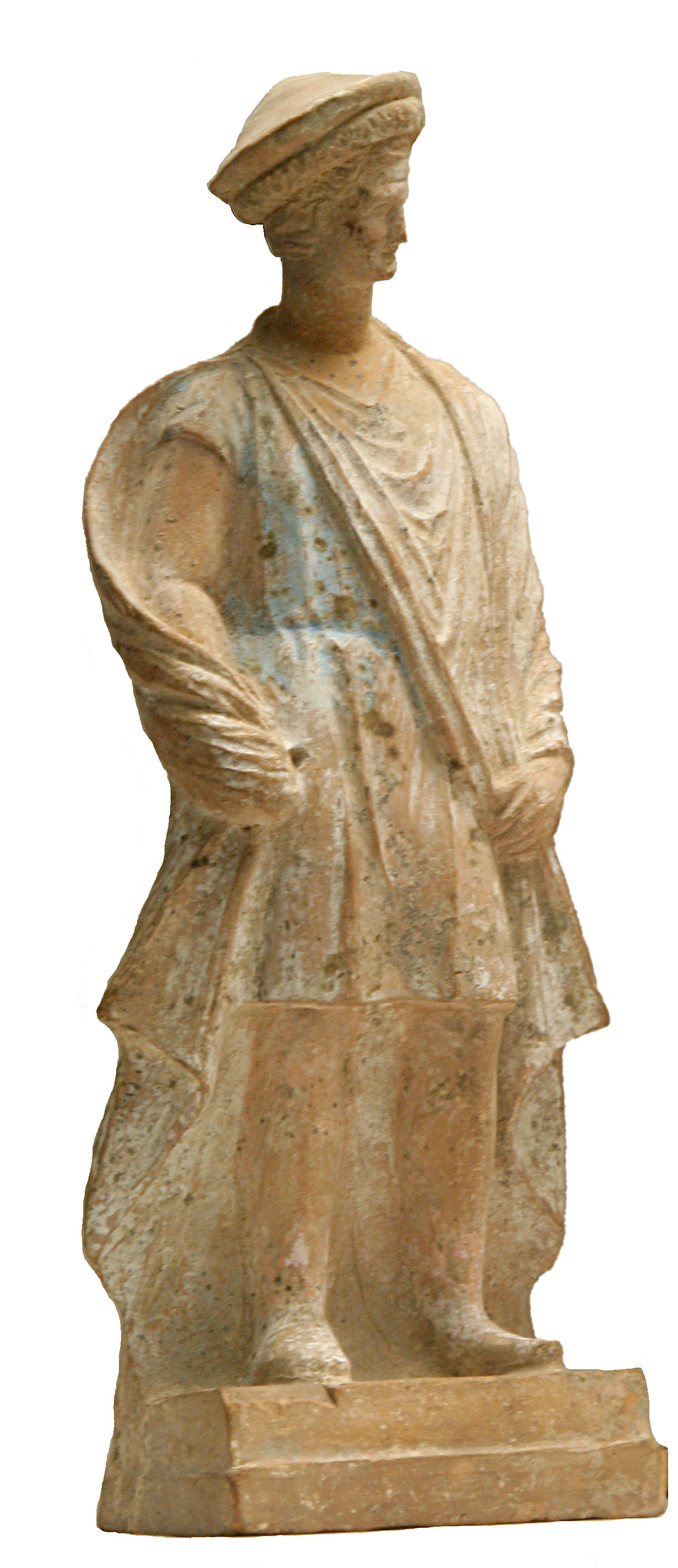
Two 4th and 3rd century BC terracotta statues from Athens depicting Ancient Greeks wearing the kausia.

The kausia or causia (Ancient Greek: καυσία) was an ancient Macedonian flat hat. A purple kausia with a diadem was worn by the Macedonian kings as part of the royal costume.

== Name ==
The name is derived from its keeping off the heat (καῦσις, kaûsis).

== Background ==
It was worn during the Hellenistic period but perhaps even before the time of Alexander the Great and was later used as a protection against the sun by the poorer classes in Rome.

Depictions of the kausia can be found on a variety of coins and statues found from the Mediterranean to the Greco-Bactrian and the Indo-Greek kingdoms in northwestern India. The Persians referred to both the Macedonians and the rest of the Greeks as "Yauna" (Ionians), but made a distinction between "Yauna by the sea" and those "with hats that look like shields" (Yauna Takabara), probably referring to the Macedonian kausia hat.

Bonnie Kingsley, while comparing the kausia with the modern pakol worn in Pakistan, Afghanistan, and Northwest India, has suggested that it might have come to the Mediterranean as a campaign hat worn by Alexander and veterans of his campaigns in the Indus Valley, particularly after Alexander's campaign in 327/326 BC in the East, obtaining them from the people in the southern Hindu Kush. According to Ernst Fredricksmeyer, the kausia was too established a staple of the Macedonian wardrobe for it to have been imported from Asia to Macedonia. Fredricksmeyer further suggested that the similarity between the pakol and the Macedonian kausia can be explained by natives adopting it from Greek soldiers and settlers after the conquest of Alexander. Willem Vogelsang dismisses either theory, stating that pakol independently appeared in the early modern period.

== Gallery ==
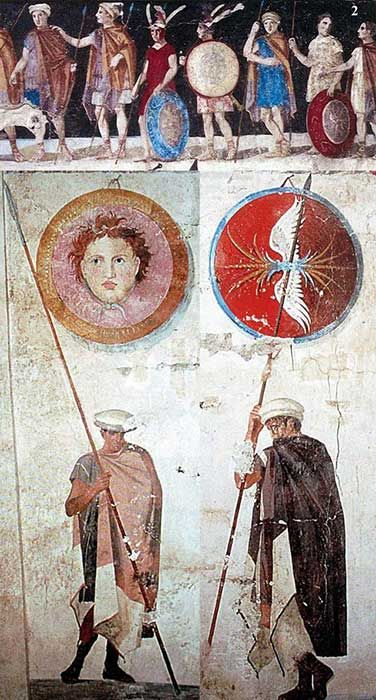
Ancient Macedonian soldiers, from the tomb of Agios Athanasios (Greece) wearing the kausia, grave of Agios Athanasios, 4th century BC

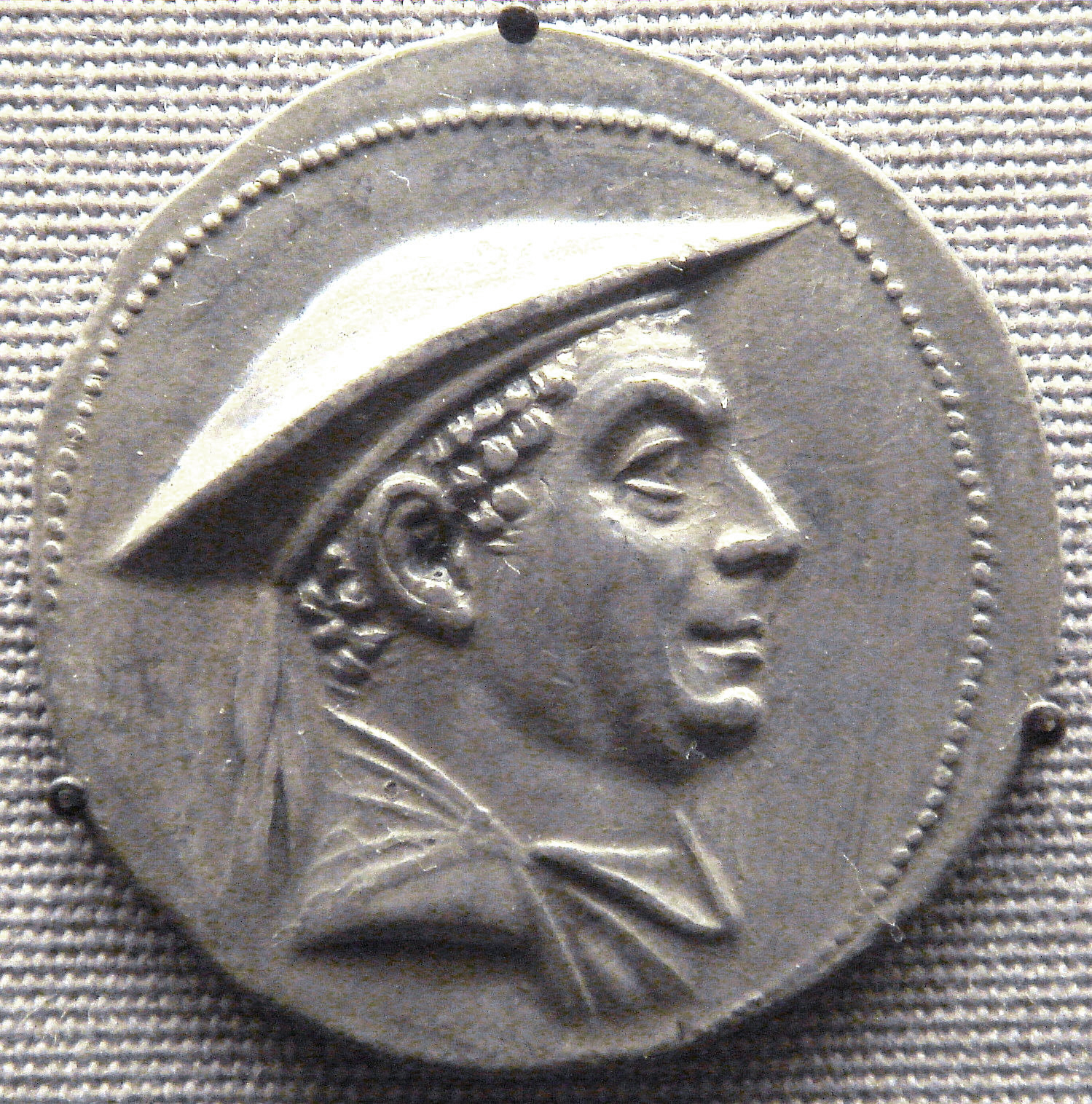
Coin of Greco-Bactrian king Antimachus I Theos wearing the Macedonian kausia, c.185–170 BC

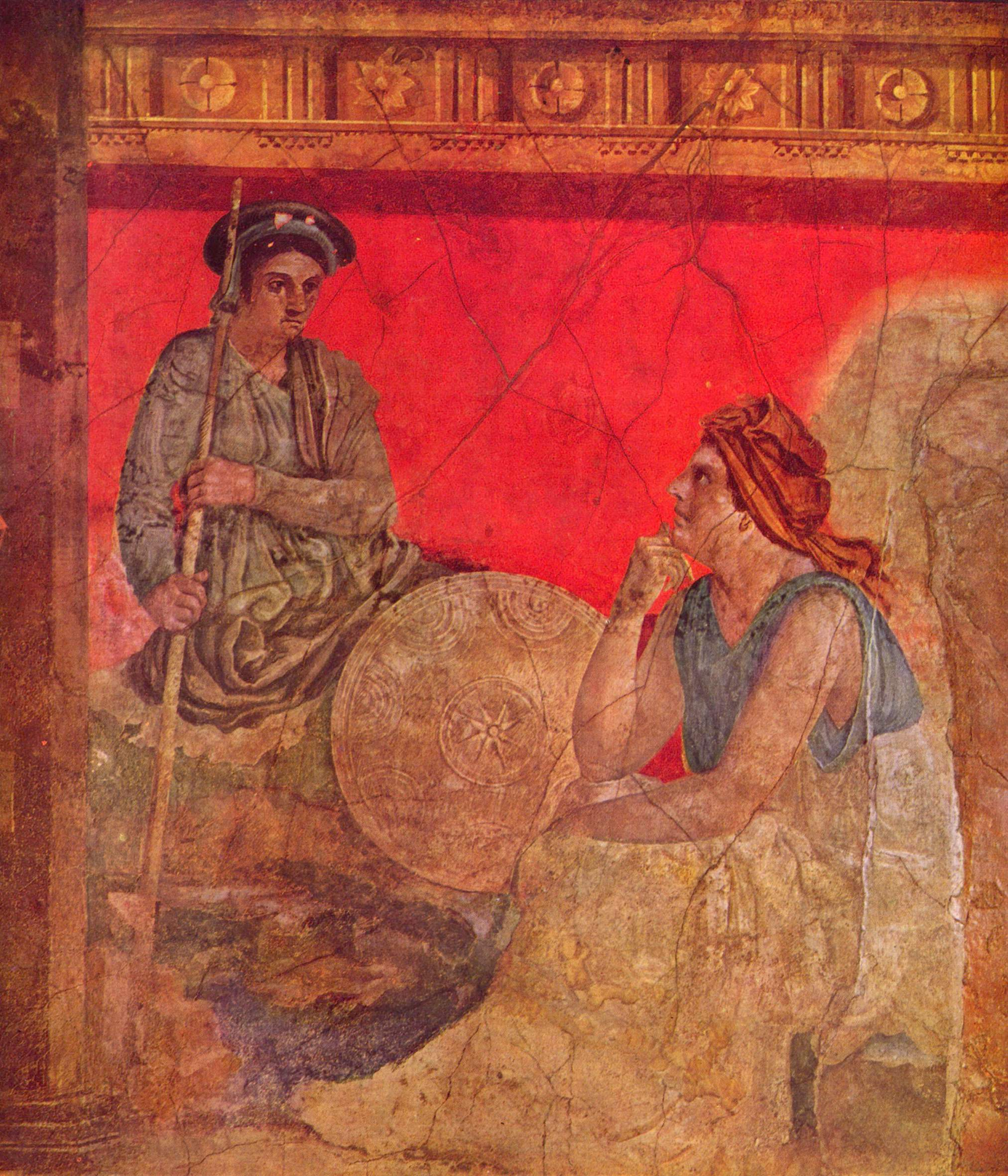
Antigonus II Gonatas wearing the kausia and holding a spear, detail of a fresco in Villa Fannius, c. 40 BC, Archaeological Museum of Naples

== See also ==
- Clothing in ancient Greece
- List of hat styles
- Pileus (hat)
- Petasos
- Konos (helmet)
