= Illyrian warfare =

The history of the Illyrians spans from the beginning of the 2nd millennium BC up to the 1st century AD in the region of Illyria and in southern Italy, where the Iapygian civilization flourished.

It concerns the armed conflicts of the Illyrian tribes and their kingdoms in the Balkans, in Italy as well as pirate activity in the Mediterranean. Apart from conflicts between Illyrians and neighbouring nations and tribes, numerous wars were recorded among Illyrian tribes themselves.

According to ancient sources, the Illyrians were renowned warriors. They were known as skilled craftsmen and shipbuilders in ancient times and controlled much of the Adriatic and Ionian Sea using their numerous warships. Illyrians had effective weapons such as the sica, a curved-tip sword that originated in Illyria and was eventually adopted all over the Balkans and used later by the Romans.

== Mythological ==
Instances of Illyrians engaged in armed conflict occurred in Greek mythology and specifically in the legend of Cadmus and Harmonia, where Cadmus led the Illyrian Enchelii in a victorious campaign against the Illyrians after divine advice from the Oracle. If the legend is true, this war would have occurred around 2000 BC, the time when Cadmus has been claimed to have lived.

== Tribal conflicts ==
Illyrian tribes were reluctant to help each other in times of war and even fought amongst each other and they sometimes allied with the neighbouring Romans and Greeks: These conflicts happened because of land, pastures and areas of natural substances such as iron and salt. The Romans, before they conquered Illyria, were involved in tribal conflicts and used them to their advantage. The most known incident is the involvement of the Romans in a war between the Dalmatians and the Liburnians over Promona, which in the end were encouraged to take peace. Commonly the Romans were ordered to act as referees in their bloody fights. The Autariatae tribe fought against the Ardiaei for control of valuable salt mines. The Ardiaei were notorious before being defeated by the Romans. The Daorsi had suffered attacks from the Delmatae to the extent that they requested Roman aid.

== States ==
The earliest recorded Illyrian Kingdom was that of the Enchele in the 8th century BC. The Enchele held dominance for two centuries until their state crumbled from the start of the 6th century BC. After the Enchelii, the Taulanti formed their own state in the 7th century BC. The Autariatae under Pleurias (337 BC) were a kingdom. The Kingdom of the Ardiaei began in 230 BC and ended in 167 BC. The most notable Illyrian kingdoms and dynasties were those of Bardyllis, Dardani and of Agron of the Ardiaei, who created the last and best-known Illyrian kingdom. Agron ruled over the Ardiaei and had extended his rule to other tribes as well. As for the Dardanians, they always had separate domains from the rest of the Illyrians.

The Illyrian kingdoms were composed of small areas within the region of Illyria. The exact extent of even the most prominent ones remains unknown. Only the Romans ruled the entire region. The internal organization of the south Illyrian kingdoms points to imitation of their neighboring Greek kingdoms and influence from the Greek and Hellenistic world in the growth of their urban centres. Polybius gives us an image of society within an Illyrian kingdom as peasant infantry fought under aristocrats, which he calls in Greek Polydynastae (Greek: Πολυδυνάστες) where each one controlled a town within the kingdom. The monarchy was established on hereditary lines and Illyrian rulers used marriages as a means of alliance with other powers. Pliny (23–79 AD) writes that the people that formed the nucleus of the Illyrian kingdom were 'Illyrians proper' or Illyrii Proprie Dicti. They were the Taulantii, the Pleraei, the Endirudini, Sasaei, Grabaei and the Labeatae. These later joined to form the Docleatae.

== Liburnian thalassocracy ==
Map of Corfu, the Liburnians most southern recorded outpost

The Liburnians navigational skills and the mobility of their swift ships, the Liburna, allowed them to be present, very early, not only along the Eastern Adriatic coast, they reached also the opposite, western, Italic coast. This process started during great Pannonian-Adriatic movements and migrations at the end of the Bronze Age, from the 12th to 10th century BC. In the Iron Age, they were already on the Italic coast, establishing colonies in Apulia and especially in Picenum, where specific Iron Age cultures developed.

From the 9th to the 6th century BC, there was certain koine – cultural unity in the Adriatic, with the general Liburninan seal, whose naval supremacy meant both political and economical authority through several centuries. Some similar toponyms attested not only Liburnian but also other Illyrian migrations to the central and south Italy, respectively Apulia and Picenum.

In the 9th century BC, they ruled the inner Adriatic Sea and in the first half of the 8th century BC they expanded southwards. According to Strabo, the Liburnians became masters of island of Corcyra, making it their most southern outpost, by which they controlled the passage into the Adriatic Sea. In 735 BC, they abandoned it, under pressure of Corinthian ruler Hersikrates, during the period of Corinthian expansion to South Italy, Sicily and the Ionian Sea. However, their position in the Adriatic Sea was still strong in the next few centuries. Corinth was the first that went up against the Liburnians. The Bacchiade expelled the Liburni and the Eretrians from Corcyra. About 625 BC, the Taulantii asked for the aid of Corinth and Corcyra against the Liburni. The Greeks were victorious.

Liburnian control of the Adriatic Sea coasts started to decrease in the 6th century BC. According to Pliny the Elder, the Liburnians lost supremacy in the Western Adriatic coast due to invasions by the Umbri and the Gauls, obviously caused by the strengthening and expansion of the Etruscan union in the 6th century BC, whose rich material presence in the basin of Po river undoubtedly meant the weakening of the Liburnian thalassocracy influence in the north-west of Adriatic. Celtic migrations into the Italian peninsula after 400 BC, significantly changed the ethnic and political picture there; it directly imperilled remaining Liburnian possessions on the western coast.

Unlike at the western Adriatic coast, Celtic raids to the narrow Liburnian region at the eastern Adriatic coast were peripheral in geographical meaning. Despite the recorded material exchange, Celtic archaeological forms are marginal and secondary in regions settled by the Histri, Iapodes, Dalmatae and are especially rare in Liburnian Iron Age heritage.

== Iapygian–Tarentine Wars ==
The Iapygian-Tarentine Wars were a set of conflicts and wars between the Greek colony of Taras (Taranto) and the three Iapygian peoples, Messapians, Peucetii and Daunians.

Conflicts started immediately after the foundation of Tars in 706 BC over domination of the fertile adjacent plains in southern Italy. The expansion of Taranto was limited to the coast because of the resistance of the populations of inner Apulia. In 473 BC, Taranto signed an alliance with Rhegion, to counter the Messapii, Peuceti, and Lucanians, but the joint armies of the Tarentines and Rhegines were defeated near Kailìa (modern Ceglie), in what Herodotus claims to be the greatest slaughter of Greeks in his knowledge, with 3,000 Reggians and uncountable Tarentines killed. In 466 BC, Taranto was again defeated by the Iapyges; according to Aristotle, who praises its government, there were so many aristocrats killed that the democratic party was able to get the power, to remove the monarchy, inaugurate a democracy, and expel the Pythagoreans.

In c.440 BC, the Messapian city-state of Brindisi entered into an alliance with Thurii. The Brindisi-Thurri army had a leadership advantage in the form of Cleandridas, an exiled Spartan general who had been banished from the Peloponnese for accepting an Athenian bribe as an advisor of the Spartan king Pleistoanax. Taranto supported the Peloponnesian side against Athens in the Peloponnesian War, refused anchorage and water to Athens in 415 BC, and even sent ships to help the Peloponnesians, after the Athenian disaster in Sicily. On the other side, Athens supported the Messapians, in order to counter Tarantine power.

After 330 BC, the Messapians joined forces with the Tarentines against an even greater force, that of Rome. The alliances with Taras and with Cleonimus of Sparta in 304 BC was an anti-Roman campaign. Thus, towards the end of the fourth century, Rome had become a common enemy for both the Iapygians and the Tarentines, even as far as ending the prolonged battles and causing them to make an alliance.

== Illyrian expansion ==
In the 4th century BC, Bardyllis became king of the Illyrians and the creator of a new dynasty after overthrowing Sirras, the previous Illyrian king, who had entered in a peace treaty over the control of Lyncestis. Bardyllis succeeded in bringing various tribes into a single organisation and soon became a formidable power in the Balkans, resulting in a change of relations with Macedonia. Using new war tactics, in 393 BC, the Illyrians won a decisive battle against Amyntas III, expelling him and ruling Macedonia through a puppet king. In 392 BC, Amyntas III allied himself with the Thessalians and took Macedonia under his rule, taking it from the Dardanians. After continuous invasions, Bardyllis forced the Macedonians to pay him an annual tribute in 372 BC.

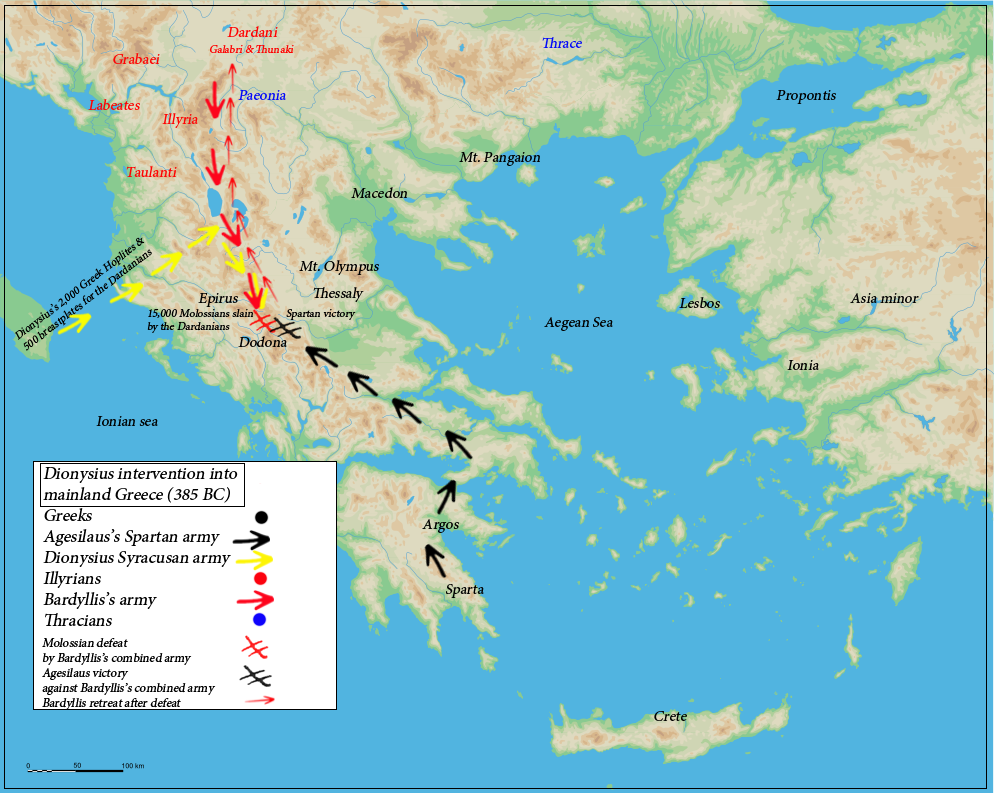
Military expeditions of Bardyllis in Epirus

In 385 BC, Bardyllis raided Epirus, which was under Molossian rule. This time, the Illyrians were allied with and aided by Dionysius of Syracuse to place Alcetas, who was a refugee in his court, to the throne. Dionysius planned to control all the Ionian Sea. Sparta had intervened as soon as the events became known and expelled the Illyrians who were led by Bardyllis. Despite being aided by 2000 Greek hoplites and five hundred suits of Greek armour, the Illyrians were defeated by the Spartans led by Agesilaus but not before ravaging the region and killing 15,000 Molossians. Thus their attempt to control Epirus failed. In 360 BC, another Illyrian attack forced the Molossian king Arymbas to evacuate his non-combatant population to Aetolia and let the Illyrians loot freely. The stratagem worked and the Molossians fell upon the Illyrians who were encumbered with booty and defeated them. In the same year Arymbas of the Mollosians defeated the Illyrians after they raided and looted Epirus.

In 360 BC, the southern Paeonian tribes launched raids against Macedonia in support of an Illyrian invasion. In 359 BC, Bardyllis won a decisive battle against the Macedonian king Perdiccas III in which the king himself was killed along with 4,000 of his soldiers and the Illyrians occupied the cities of upper Macedonia. The Macedonian king's attempt to reconquer upper Macedonia had failed.

Following the disastrous defeat of the Macedonians by Bardyllis, when king Philip took control of the Macedonian throne in 358 BC, he reaffirmed the treaty with the Illyrians, marrying the Illyrian princess Audata, probably the daughter or the niece of Bardyllis. This gave, Philip valuable time to gather his forces and to defeat the Illyrians, who were still under Bardyllis, in the decisive Erigon Valley battle by killing about 7,000 and eliminating the Illyrian menace for some time. In this battle, Bardyllis himself was killed at the age of 90 after Philip II refused a peace treaty offered by the Illyrians. In 335 BC the southern Illyrian states were all subjected by Alexander the Great and only at the end of the 4th century BC won their independence.

In 358 BC, Phillip of Macedon defeated Bardyllis, Diodorus Siculus (1st century BC) writes this of the event;

And at first for a long while the battle was evenly poised because of the exceeding gallantry displayed on both sides, and as many were slain and still more wounded, the fortune of battle vacillated first one way then the other, being constantly swayed by the valorous deeds of the combatants; but later as the horsemen pressed on from the flank and rear and Philip with the flower of his troops fought with true heroism, the mass of the Illyrians was compelled to take hastily to flight. When the pursuit had been kept up for a considerable distance and many had been slain in their flight, Philip recalled the Macedonians with the trumpet and erecting a trophy of victory buried his own dead, while the Illyrians, having sent ambassadors and withdrawn from all the Macedonian cities, obtained peace. But more than seven thousand Illyrians were slain in this battle.

== Gallic invasions ==
From the 4th century BC, Celtic groups pushed into the Carpathian region and the Danube basin, coinciding with their movement into Italy. According to legend, 300,000 Celts moved into Italy and Illyria. By the 3rd century, the native inhabitants of Pannonia were almost completely Celticized. The Illyrians had been waging war against the Greeks, leaving their western flank weak. Whilst Alexander ruled Greece, the Celts dared not to push south near Greece. Therefore, early Celtic expeditions were concentrated against Illyrian tribes.

We have little information about the affairs in the Illyrian hinterland, but we do know that the first Balkan tribe to be defeated by the Celts was the Autariatae, who, during the 4th century, had enjoyed a hegemony over much of the central Balkans, centred on the Morava valley. An interesting account of cunning Celtic tactics is revealed in their attacks on the Ardiaei. In 310 BC, the Celtic general Molistomos attacked deep into Illyrian territory, subduing the Dardanians and the Paeonians.

In 280 BC, they moved in three directions: toward Macedonia and Illyria, toward Greece, and toward Thrace. According to Diodorus, the main army of 150,000-foot soldiers equipped with great shields and 10,000 horsemen was followed by 2,000 wagons transporting food and equipment. All the states of the Balkans at this time looked at this movement with apprehension. Ptolemy, the king of Macedonia, took the news of the Gauls casually. He looked down with derision on the proposal of the king of the Dardanians (possibly Monunius), who sent delegates to say that they could offer 20,000 warriors to assist him. In an insulting manner, he said that the work was for the Macedonians to do. When the king of the Dardanians was told of this, he replied that the soon glorious Macedonian kingdom would fall because of the immaturity of a youth. And so it happened, for in the battle that took place a few days later in Macedonia, the Macedonian army was routed and Ptolemy was wounded and taken prisoner. After continuing south and raiding Delphi, the Gallic army decided to return up north to their homeland but were all wiped out by the Dardanians, through which they had to pass.

== Wars against Rome ==
In the First Illyrian War, which lasted from 229 BC to 228 BC, Rome's concern with the trade routes running across the Adriatic Sea increased after the First Punic War, when many tribes of Illyria became united under one queen, Teuta. The death of a Roman envoy named Coruncanius on the orders of Teuta and the attack on trading vessels owned by Italian merchants under Rome's protection, prompted the Roman senate to dispatch a Roman army under the command of the consuls Lucius Postumius Albinus (consul 234 and 229 BC) and Gnaeus Fulvius Centumalus. Rome expelled Illyrian garrisons at the Greek cities Epidamnus, Apollonia, Korkyra, Pharos and others and established a protectorate over these Greek towns.

The Romans also set up Demetrius of Pharos as a power in Illyria to counterbalance the power of Teuta.

The Second Illyrian War lasted from 220 BC to 219 BC. In 219 BC the Roman Republic was at war with the Celts of Cisalpine Gaul, and the Second Punic War with Carthage was beginning. These distractions gave Demetrius the time he needed to build a new Illyrian war fleet. Leading this fleet of 90 ships, Demetrius sailed south of Lissus, violating his earlier treaty and starting the war.

Demetrius' fleet first attacked Pylos where he captured 50 ships after several attempts. From Pylos the fleet sailed to the Cyclades, quelling resistance they found on the way. Demetrius foolishly sent a fleet across the Adriatic, and, with the Illyrian forces divided, the fortified city of Dimale was captured by the Roman fleet under Lucius Aemilius Paulus. From Dimale the navy went towards Pharos. The forces of Rome routed the Illyrians and Demetrius fled to Macedon where he became a trusted councillor at the court of Philip V of Macedon, and remained until his death at Messene in 214 BC.

During the Third Illyrian War in 168 BC the Illyrian king Gentius allied himself with the Macedonians. First in 171 BC, he was allied with the Romans against the Macedonians, but in 169 he changed sides and allied himself with Perseus of Macedon. He arrested two Roman legati and destroyed the cities of Apollonia and Dyrrhachium, which were allied with Rome. In 168 he was defeated at Scodra by a Roman force under L. Anicius Gallus, and in 167 brought to Rome as a captive to participate in Gallus' triumph, after which he was interned in Iguvium. In the Illyrian Wars of 229 BC, 219 BC and 168 BC, Rome overran the Illyrian settlements and suppressed piracy, which had made Adriatic Sea an unsafe region for Roman commerce. There were three Roman campaigns: the first against Teuta the second against Demetrius of Pharos and the third against Gentius. The first Roman campaign of 229 BC marked the first time that the Roman Navy crossed the Adriatic in order to launch the invasion.

== Great Illyrian revolt ==
The Great Illyrian Revolt, (Bellum Batonianum or Pannonian Revolt) was a major conflict between an alliance of Illyrian communities and the Roman forces that lasted for four years beginning in AD 6 and ending in AD 9. In AD 6, several regiments of Daesitiates, natives of area that now comprises central Bosnia and Herzegovina, led by Bato the Daesitiate (Bato I), were gathered in one place to prepare to join Augustus's stepson and senior military commander Tiberius in a war against the Germans. Instead, the Daesitiates mutinied and defeated a Roman force sent against them. The Daesitiates were soon joined by the Breuci led by Bato of the Breuci (Bato II), another community inhabiting the region between the rivers Sava and Drava in modern Croatia. They gave battle to a second Roman force from Moesia led by Caecina Severus (the governor of Moesia). Despite their defeat, they inflicted heavy casualties at the Battle of Sirmium. The rebels were now joined by a large number of other communities. At risk was the strategic province of Illyricum, recently expanded to include the territory of the Pannonii, an indigenous communities inhabiting the region between the rivers Drava and Sava, who were subjugated by Rome in 12–9 BC. Illyricum was on Italy's eastern flank, exposing the Roman heartland to the fear of a rebel invasion.

Augustus ordered Tiberius to break off operations in Germany and move his main army to Illyricum. Tiberius sent Marcus Valerius Messalla Messallinus (the governor of Dalmatia and Pannonia) ahead with troops. The panic broke out in Rome and Augustus raised a second task force under Tiberius's nephew Germanicus. He resorted to the compulsory purchase and emancipation of thousands of slaves in order to amass enough troops. This happened for the first time since the aftermath of the Battle of Cannae two centuries earlier. At one moment, in winter AD 6/7, 10 legions were deployed and an equivalent number of auxilia (70 cohors, 10 ala and more than 10,000 veterans). In addition, they were assisted by a large number of Thracian troops deployed by their King Rhoemetalces I, a Roman amicus ("ally") a grand total of some 100,000 men.

They faced further reverses on the battlefield and a bitter guerrilla war in the Bosnian mountains, but bitter fighting also occurred in southern Pannonia around Mons Almus (modern Fruška Gora) near Sirmium. It took them three years of hard fighting to quell the revolt, which was described by the Roman historian Suetonius as the most difficult conflict faced by Rome since the Punic Wars two centuries earlier. Tiberius finally quelled the revolt in AD 9. This was just in time: that same year Arminius destroyed Varus's three legions in Germany. The Roman high command did not doubt that Arminius would have formed a grand alliance with the Illyrians.

The fighting of the Illyrian Revolt had lasting effects on Roman soldiers. Unhappy with their payment of swampy and mountainous Pannonian lands for such harsh military service, and with abuses relating to their pay and conditions, Roman soldiers staged a mutiny in AD 14 demanding recompense. Tiberius dispatched his son, Drusus, to pacify the mutineers.

== Tactics and troop organization ==
Illyrians in ancient sources were known as brave and skilled fighters. The Illyrians appeared in war as free warriors under their rulers or kings. Similar to other societies the status of a leader was determined by the number of warriors who followed him. Obedience to a higher authority such as a king was channelled through the collective loyalty of a tribe to the chief. In historical sources they are described as a peasant infantry fighting under aristocratic proprietors (polydynastae) each one controlling a town within the kingdom. The Dalmatians were known to use Partisan tactics against the Romans which were successful in inflicting serious defeats on the best of the Roman legions.

Diodorus Siculus (1st century BC) writes of the Illyrian military formation in this battle that was an attempt for a coordinated stance by forming a square. His exact words are: "Ἰλλυριοὶ συντάξαντες ἑαυτούς εἰς πλινθίον ἐρρωμένος".

"But the Illyrians, forming themselves into a square, courageously entered the fray. And at first for a long while the battle was evenly poised because of the exceeding gallantry displayed on both sides, and as many were slain and still more wounded, the fortune of battle vacillated first one way then the other"

In the 2nd century BC, the army of Agron and Teuta is no more represented in phalanxes but in smaller troops, armoured well and fast moving. These tactics also used in Roman times were ready for independent operations and so were more effective than earlier phalanxes. These exact tactics were agile for quick and surprising actions and soon showed to be superior against Greek tactics and as a result the Illyrians achieved victories over the Greeks.

On the sea the Illyrians used guerrilla tactics with their sophisticated navy. These sea tactics made the Illyrians masters of the Adriatic Sea for many centuries. Their ships, which were relatively small were not capable of direct naval battle with the heavier war-ships of the Greeks and Romans and most of the time were defeated. An exception is the victory over the island of Paxoi, where the Illyrians used a new form of tactic which involved connecting their ships in groups of four in order to attack Greek ships.

== Weaponry ==
The fact that Illyrian warriors were buried with their weapons has resulted in an abundant amount of surviving intact. The works of ancient authors fail to provide a clear picture on Illyrian weapons and the only true contributor to this matter was the Roman poet Ennius (239 BC – 169 BC) who was of Messapian origin. Weaponry was very important to the Illyrians in the time of war; however, at times, only the rich and nobles could afford some types, like greaves and helmets. A great deal of armor was imported mainly to the Greek mainland, as proven by the discovery of Greek weapons in Glacinac graves dating from the 7th century BC.

Shields were used among the Illyrians as early as the Bronze Age. In the Iron Age two types of shields were used: the Illyrian circular shield and the oval/rectangular type used by the northern Illyrians. The most common was the circular shield, which was made of wood and leather with a bronze boss and was like a mostly light pelte. The Illyrian circular shield resembled the Macedonian version but differed from the number of circular decortication. Their shapes with either round (peltes), rectangular or oval. A type of wooden oblong shield with an iron boss was introduced to Illyria from the Celts. This type of shield resembled the Illyrian oval shield used in northern Illyria.

Breast-armour and greaves were a speciality for the rich only in Illyrian society. Bronze breast-armor was used very rarely by the northern Illyrians and only three examples have been discovered so far in Slovenia. However another form of body armor was a bronze pectoral that may have protected part of the back as well. It was more like a disc "breastplate" of 10 cm in diameter. Greaves to protect the legs were used from the 7th century BC and probably even earlier. They first appeared in Illyria from its southern borders and are found only in princely graves.

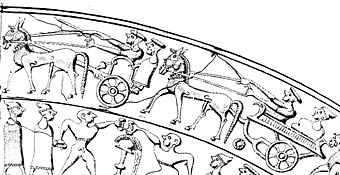
Illyrian chariots from Vace – 6th century BC

In northern Illyria the bronze helmet was employed. The bronze helmet developed into the common Conical helmet which sometimes contained a plume. The most intriguing of all Illyrian helmets developed, the Shmarjet helmet, was made by the Japodes in the Lika valley. It was made from wicker and chain-mail while metal plates around the sides were optional. Under influence from Illyria's northern neighbours, the Italic peoples, the Negau helmet was used from the 5th century BC to the 4th century BC. The most widespread helmet was the Illyrian helmet with its use beginning from the 7th century BC. The Illyrian helmet was made from bronze and consisted of a great, crested plume on the top. The origin and the time period this helmet used has been a subject of much debate. Some experts allocate its origins in Corinth and claim it went out of use in Illyria in the 4th century BC. Others claim that the helmet has its origins in Illyria and that it was used up to the 2nd century BC, proven by depictions on Illyrian city coins of the time.

The principal sword of the Illyrians was the sica, a single-edged curved sword similar to the Greek machaira. The sica was developed during the Bronze Age. The sica's blade was about 16–18 inches (41–46 centimetres) long. It became widely used and adopted by other peoples such as the Thracians, Dacians and the Romans. The Illyrians also used the fighting sword short curved swords, long swords in addition to various knives. According to historian John Wilkes:

Although a short curved sword was used by several peoples around the Mediterranean the Romans regarded the sica as a distinct Illyrian weapon used by the stealthy 'assassin' (sicarius)

The Illyrians also used a variety of other weapons, like javelins, long metallic spears called Sibyna (Ancient Greek Σιβύνη) that resembled boar spears, short thrusting spears, battle axes, single-handed axes that could be hurled and also bows and arrows which were used from the start of the 2nd millennium BC.

== Mercenaries ==
Illyrians acted as mercenaries on several occasions whether on the side of the Greeks or the Romans. Perdiccas II of Macedon had hired Illyrian mercenaries in the 5th century BC but they betrayed him, allying with his enemy, Arrhabaeus of Lyncus. In another incident, Lysimachus killed all of his 5,000 Illyrian mercenaries (of the Autariatae tribe) to the last man, because he was convinced that they would join the enemy. Previously in 302 BC 2,000 of his Illyrian mercenaries had defected to Antigonus. Illyrians were not considered as reliable mercenaries, in the ancient world but were at the same time acknowledged as a skilled fighting force

== Nobility ==
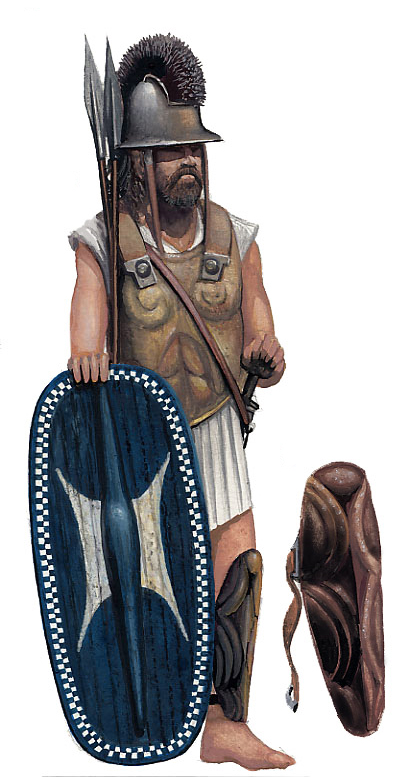
Illyrian king or noble, 500 BC – 100 BC

The nobility had access to breastplates and greaves whilst the bulk of the army did not. The kings did not resemble the rest of the army and were the only ones with full body protection which was a rarity. Illyrian kings and rulers wore bronze torques around their necks and were heavily armoured in antithesis to the bulk of their armies. A number of weapons and armaments were imported from Greece including helmets. Armaments were mostly made of bronze. Another form of body armour was a bronze pectoral (that may have protected part of the back as well). It was more like a disc "breastplate" of 10 cm in diameter. Local greaves made of bronze were strapped on the legs. Metal riveted belts were used as well.

== Illyrian navy ==
The Illyrians were notorious sailors in the ancient world. They were great ship builders and seafarers. The most skillful Illyrian sailors were the Liburnians, Japodes, Delmatae and Ardiaei. The greatest navy was built by Agron in the 3rd century BC. The Illyrian tactics consisted of lashing their galleys together in groups of four and inviting a broadside attack from a ram. The Illyrians would then board the enemy craft in overwhelming numbers. Illyrian war ships were adopted by many peoples especially the Greeks and Romans. Illyrian craftsmen were even hired by the King of Macedon to build 100 ships in the First Macedonian War because to him they bore a special gift of ship building. The earliest evidence of Illyrian ships is from the design of a ship incised on bronze greaves from Glasinac dating from the 8th century BC to the 7th century BC. The front of this ship is constructed in the form of an animal probably a horse.

Illyrian ships were a favourite depiction on Illyrian coins especially on the coinage of the Labatae. The type of war ships presented on the coins is hard to determine. However, all the depictions show a similarity in which the bows of the ships were shaped in the form of a serpents head. The Byzantine author from the 6th century wrote that the Adriatic was a sea in which serpents swam.

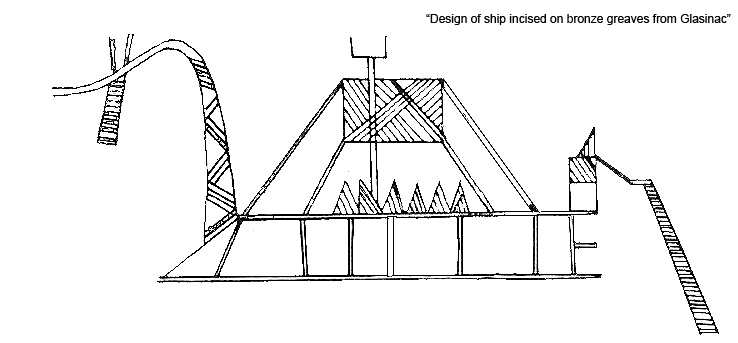
The earliest depiction of an Illyrian ship dating from the 8th–7th century BC

The Liburnians were renowned seafarers dominating the Adriatic and Ionian Sea from the start of the 1st millennium to the 5th century BC. The Romans knew them principally as a people addicted to piracy. The major harbour of Liburnian navy since the 5th century BC was Corynthia at eastern cape of Krk island, including 7 unearthed docks, marine arsenal, and stony fortifications; this early harbour persisted in ancient and medieval function to the 16th century. Liburnians constructed different ship types; their galaia was an early prototype of transport galleys, lembus was a fishing ship continued by the actual Croatian levut, and a drakoforos was apparently mounted with a dragon head at the prow. Remains of a 10 meters long ship from the 1st century BC, were found in Zaton near Nin (Aenona in Classical Liburnia), a ship keel with bottom planking made of 6 rows of the wooden boards on each side, specifically joined together, sewn with resin cords and wooden wedges, testifying the Liburnian shipbuilding tradition style, therefore named "Serilia Liburnica". Deciduous trees (oak and beech) were used, while some climber was used for the cords.

The Illyrians were often referred to as pirates, raiding Greek and Roman vessels. Illyrian's indulgence in piracy was one that brought them infamy and invited their downfall. Their rugged broken coast with its screen of islands formed a perfect base from which their light and speedy little to attack unwary ships. The Illyrians piratical career reached its zenith under Queen Teuta. The Illyrians practised boarding tactics against enemy vessels. Although this view was widely accepted at first this connection is not completely true. Ancient Greek and Roman authors often attacked Illyrians in their works merely because they saw them as enemies and so many sources may be heavily exaggerated.

The three main types of Illyrian warships were the Lembus, the Liburna and the Pristis.

=== Lembus ===
The lembos (from Greek: λέμβος, "boat", romanized as lembus), was an ancient Illyrian warship, with a single bank of oars and no sails. It was small and light, with a low freeboard. It was a fast and manoeuvrable warship capable of carrying 50 men in addition to the rowers. It was most commonly associated with the vessels used by the Illyrian tribes, chiefly for piracy, in the area of Dalmatia. This type of craft was also adopted by Philip V of Macedon, and soon after by the Seleucids, Rome, and even the Spartan king Nabis in his attempt to rebuild the Spartan navy.

In contemporary authors, the name was associated with a class rather than a specific type of vessels, as considerable variation is evident in the sources: the number of oars ranged from 16 to 50, they could be one- or double-banked, and some types did not have a ram, presumably being used as couriers and fast cargo vessels.

=== Liburna ===
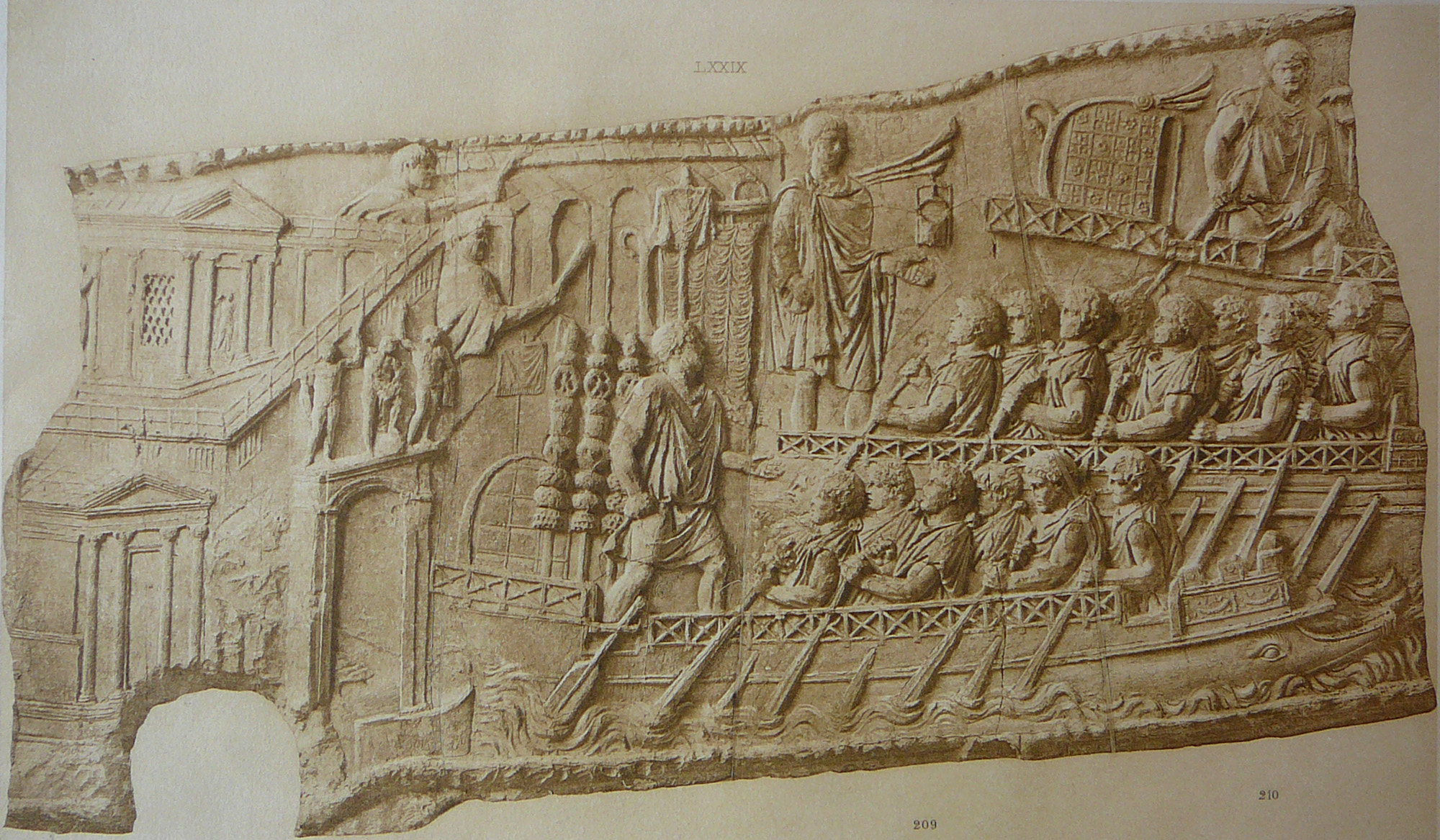
Romanized Liburna during Trajan's Dacian Wars.

The most known Liburnian ship was their warship, known as a libyrnis to the Greeks and a liburna to the Romans, propelled by oars. According to some thoughts, liburna was shown in the scene of naval battle, curved on a stone tablet (Stele di Novilara) found near Antique Pisaurum (Pesaro), outlined to 5th or 6th century BC, the most possibly showing imaginary battle between Liburnian and Picenian fleets. Liburna was presented as light type of the ship with one row or the oars, one mast, one sail and prow twisted outwards. Under the prow there was a rostrum made for striking the enemy ships under the sea.

By its original form, the Liburna was the most similar to the Greek penteconter. It had one bench with 25 oars on each side, while in the late ages of the Roman Republic, it became a smaller version of a trireme, but with two banks of oars (a bireme), faster, lighter, and more agile than biremes and triremes. The Liburnian design was adopted by the Romans and became a key part of Ancient Rome's navy, most possibly by mediation of Macedonian navy in the 2nd half of the 1st century BC. Liburna ships played a key role in naval battle of Actium in Greece, which lasted from August 31 to September 2 of 31 BC. Because of its naval and manoeuvrer features and bravery of its Liburnian crews, these ships completely defeated much bigger and heavier eastern ships, quadriremes and penterames. Liburna was different from the battle triremes, quadriremes and quinqueremes not because of rowing but rather because of its specific constructional features. It was 109 ft (33 m) long and 16 ft (5 m) wide with a 3 ft (0.91 m) draft. Two rows of oarsmen pulled 18 oars per side. The ship could make up to 14 knots under sail and more than 7 under oars. Such a vessel, used as a merchantman, might take on a passenger, as Lycinus relates in the 2nd-century dialogue, traditionally attributed to Lucian of Samosata: "I had a speedy vessel readied, the kind of bireme used above all by the Liburnians of the Ionian Gulf."

Once the Romans had adopted the Liburnian, they proceeded to make a few adaptations to improve the ships’ use within the navy. The benefits gained from the addition of rams and protection from missiles more than made-up for the slight loss of speed. Besides the construction, the ships required that the regular Roman military unit be simplified in order to function more smoothly. Each ship operated as an individual entity, so the more complicated organization normally used was not necessary. Within the navy, there were probably Liburnian of several varying sizes, all put to specific tasks such as scouting and patrolling Roman waters against piracy. The Romans made use of the liburnian particularly within the provinces of the empire, where the ships formed the bulk of the fleets, while it was included by small numbers in fleets of Ravenna and Micenum, where a large number of the Illyrians were serving, especially Dalmatae, Liburnians and Pannonians.

Gradually liburna became general name for the different types of the Roman ships, attached also to the cargo ships in the Late Antique. Tacitus and Suetonius were using it as a synonym for the battle ship. In inscriptions it was mentioned as the last in class of the battle ships: hexeres, penteres, quadrieres, trieres, liburna.

In the Medieval sources the "liburna" ships were often recorded in use by the Medieval Croatian and Dalmatian pirates and sailors, but probably not always referring to the ships of the same form.

=== Pristis ===
The Pristis (Ancient Greek Πρίστις) was a beaked long and narrow war ship(it was also the name of a specific ship in the Aeneid.)

== Fortifications ==
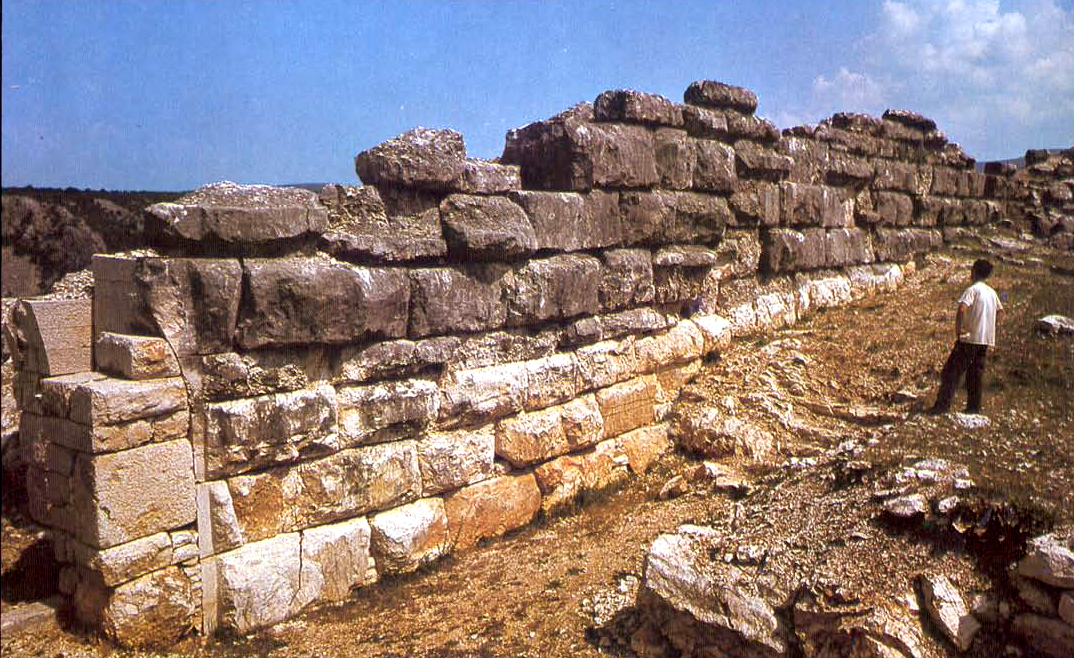
Giant walls of Daorson

Illyrians built hill-forts as places of refuge (and perhaps as dwellings) such as Tilurium and Setovia of the Delmatae. Most enclosures were round or oval with very few exceptions for other shapes and the largest two were 200 meters across while most are not anything more than fortified blockhouses.

The Castellieri were fortified boroughs, usually located on hills or mountains or, more rarely (such as in Friuli), in plains. They were constituted by one or more concentric series of walls, of rounded or elliptical shape in Istria and Venezia Giulia, or quadrangular in Friuli, within which was the inhabited area. Some a hundred of castellieri have been discovered in Istria, Friuli and Venezia Giulia, such as that of Leme, in the central-western Istria, of the Elleri, near Muggia, of Monte Giove near Prosecco (Trieste) and San Polo, not far from Monfalcone. However, the largest castelliere was perhaps that of Nesactium, in the southern Istria, not far from Pula.

== External influences ==
=== Hellenistic influence ===
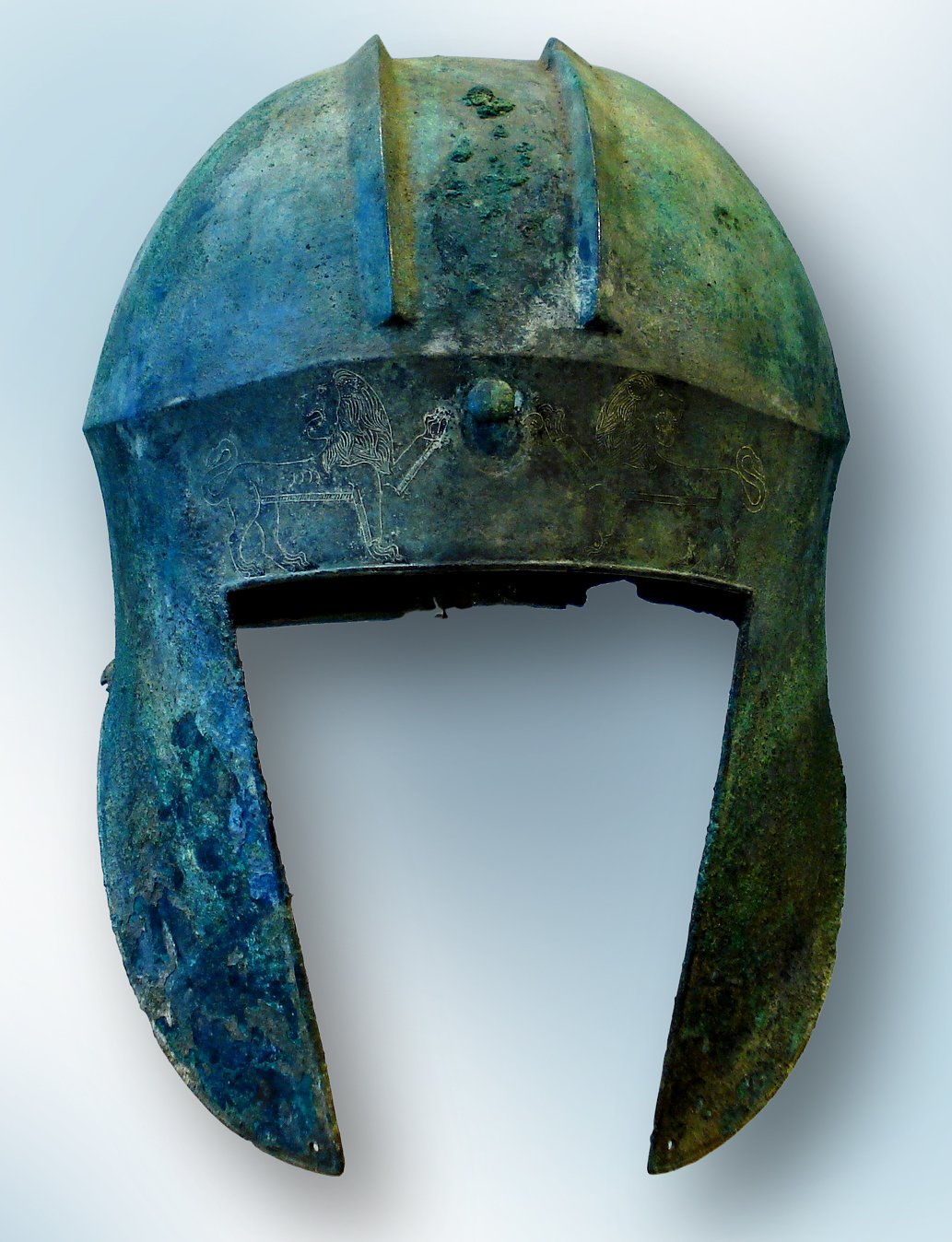
Illyrian helmet from Argolis. 6–5th century BC

The graves of Illyrian nobles (early Iron Age, 7th century BC – 5th century BC) contained a great number of Greek imports including weaponry. This includes finds at Glasinac (Bosnia and Herzegovina), Lake Ohrid in North Macedonia, Lower Carniola in Slovenia and various sites in Albania. The Glasinac culture encompasses eastern Bosnia, south-western Serbia, Montenegro and northern Albania. Ancient Greek Illyrian type helmets either as imports or later copies had spread throughout Illyria and one was found as far as Slovenia (though again in the grave of a king) not only in the Glasinac cultural area like the helmet found in the grave at Klicevo, Montenegro. The Greek helmets found in some of these sites were of "type I" and very few of "type II".

Illyrians on the coast of the Adriatic were under the effects and influence of Hellenisation due to their proximity to the Greek colonies in Illyria. Apart from other cultural influences and imported weapons and armour from the Ancient Greeks the Illyrians had adopted the ornamentation of Ancient Macedon on their shields and used similar designs on bracelets. The Illyrians used four concentric half circles whilst the Macedonians five. This ancient Greek symbol was prominent in Thessaly and Macedon, appearing in the 10th century BC and had spread throughout southern Greece. A typical adoption of the symbol in the Hellenistic period from Illyrians is seen on an iron round pelte with similar decorations and a diameter of 35 cm. This is evident during the Greek rule of south Illyria the Antipatrid dynasty & the Antigonid dynasty retained until the Roman conquest. Tactics had been influenced as well, evident in an incident involving Dardanians. The Hellenised city of Daorson located in Dalmatia included "cyclopean walls".

=== Roman ===
Illyria became a Roman province at 168 BC. The Illyrians, that were eventually Romanized rebelled in AD 6. Nearly two hundred years of Roman rule changed the weapons of the Illyrians by the time of the rebellion and they resembled those of Roman legionaries. The tribes that rebelled had been Celticized by the time Romans conquered Illyria in 168 BC and their equipment reflected this. Inhabitants of Roman Dalmatia applied a poison on their arrows called ninum. This was not a Roman influence but was mentioned during that time.

== Timeline ==
- Enchelii under Cadmus against Illyrians in Illyria, Illyrian defeat

=== 8th century BC ===
- 735 BC. Liburnians abandon Corfu under pressure from Corinthian ruler Hersikrates. First recorded battle between Illyrians and Greeks.

=== 7th century BC ===
- 691 BC. First Illyrian invasion of Macedonia after bad relations develop.
- ? BC. Gaularos, ruler of the Taulanti state wages war on the Macedonians.
- 628 BC. Liburnians expelled from Durrës by Corinthians which were invited as aid by the neighbouring Taulantii
- 602 BC. Philip I of Macedon is killed in battle by the Illyrians

=== 6th century BC ===
- 524 BC. Etruscans defeat the Liburnians in order to open trade routes to the Aegean.
- 524 BC. Aristodemus of Cumae defeats the allied Daunian and Etruscan armies
- 511 BC. Persians under Megabazus defeat the Paeonians and depart two of their tribes to Darius in Asia.
- 500 BC. Start of the Tarentine-Iapygian wars results in an Iapygian defeat

=== 5th century BC ===
- 490 BC. Tarentines defeat the Messapians
- 466 BC. Taranto again defeated by the Iapygians
- 460 BC. Competitive trading leads to the destruction of Thronion by Apollonia
- 460 BC. Opis of the Iapyges falls in battle against Taranto
- 440 BC. Brindidi and Thurrii enter into an alliance against Taranto
- 436 BC. Taulantii attack the city of Epidamnos contributing to the start of the Peloponnesian War
- 433 BC. Messapian-Thurian victory over the Lucanians in the Sybaris lain
- 432 BC. Messapian-Thurian forces successfully throw off another Lucanian invasion in the Crati gorge
- 430 BC. Grabus of the royal house of the Grabaei enters an alliance with Athens
- 429 BC. Agrianes become subject to the Odrysian kingdom
- 424 BC. Autariatae expand their territory, pushing the Thracian Triballi eastwards into western Serbia and Bulgaria
- 423 BC. Illyrians & Lyncestians cause the Macedonians to flee and the Spartans to escape during the Peloponnesian War (Battle of Lyncestis)
- 418 BC. Artas made a proxenos of Athens as operations in Sicily begin
- 413 BC. Artas supplies the Athens with one hundred and fifty javelin-throwers for the war against Syracuse.

=== 4th century BC ===
- 399 BC. New conflict develops between Sirras and Archelaus I of Macedonian over the Lyncestian case
- 393 BC. Dardanians rule Macedonia through a puppet king after defeating Amyntas III of Macedon under Argaeus II
- 392 BC. Amyntas III allied with the Thessalians takes Macedonia under his rule from the Dardanians
- 385 BC. Bardyllis raids Epirus after defeating the Mollosians
- 385 BC. Agesilaus of Sparta drives off the Dardanians under Bardyllis, expelling them from Epirus
- 360 BC. Arymbas of the Mollosians defeats the Illyrians after they raided and looted Epirus
- 360 BC. Southern Paeonian tribes launch raids against Macedonia in support of an Illyrian invasion
- 359 BC. The death of Agis leads to the subjection of the Paeonian State by Macedonia
- 359 BC. Perdiccas III of Macedon killed in an attempt to reconquer upper Macedonia
- 358 BC. Philip II of Macedon defeats the Illyrians. Bardyllis probably died during the battle at the age of 90. Illyrians sued for peace.
- 356 BC. Lycceius joins the anti-Macedonian coalition led by Athens which includes Grabos
- 356 BC. Parmenio surprises Grabos with a defeat before he is able to converge with his allies in Athens and Thrace and Paeonia
- 352 BC. Agrianes become allies of Philip II
- 344 BC. Caeria loses her life in a battle against Cynane and her army is defeated
- 344 BC. The Taulantii State is limited to the lands along the Adriatic after the defeat of Pleuratus I against Philip II
- 337 BC. Pleurias almost succeeds in killing Philip II during his Balkan campaigns
- 335 BC. Alexander the Great subjects the Illyrian states defeating Cleitus and Glaukias in the battle of Pelium
- 335 BC. First part of the Illyrian Revolt ends in failure with the defeat of Pleurias
- 323 BC. Cynane, an Illyrian herself leads a Macedonian army to victory over the Illyrians
- 317 BC. Glaucias enters in league with the Greek colonies while Cassander is at a low ebb
- 312 BC. Acrotatus of Sparta aids Glaucias in abolishing the Macedonian garrison in Apollonia
- 312 BC. Glaucias obtains control of Epidamnus with the help of Corcyra
- 310 BC. The Autariatae State ceases to exist after continuous Celtic migrations and conflicts
- 307 BC. Glaucias invades Epirus and establishes Pyrrhus as king

=== 3rd century BC ===
- 280 BC. Celts invade the Balkan peninsula, crossing through Dardanian and Paeonian territory into Macedonia and Greece, reaching Thermopylae by 279 BC. Dardanian pleas for help unanswered by Macedonian king Ptolemy Keraunos.
- 279 BC. Celts defeated after raiding Delphi by a Greek coalition. They hastily retreat to the north. Along the way they are harassed by Dardanians and lose most of their plunder. Autariatai absorbed by the Celts.
- 231 BC. Agron, king of the Ardiaei, sends his fleet to relieve the Acarnanian city Medeon from a siege by the Aetolians. His army carries a large victory
- 230 BC. Longarus, king of the Dardanians captures Bylazora from the Paeonians
- 230 BC. Queen Teuta starts her pirate campaign by capturing the Epirote capital Phoenice
- 229 BC. Illyrian and Acarnanian ships defeat a combined Aetolian and Achaean fleet off the island of Paxos
- 229 BC. The Illyrian commander Demetrius of Pharos occupies the island of Corcyra, but soon prefers to pass it over to the Romans
- 229 BC. Start of the First Illyrian War, the Romans cross the Adriatic for the first time in reaction to Teuta's threats of Roman trade routes
- 228 BC. Illyrians suffer multiple defeats by the Romans. End of First Illyrian War
- 220 BC. Start of the Second Illyrian War when Demetrius of Pharos builds up a new Illyrian navy and violates the Roman-Illyrian treaty by attacking Aegean cities
- 219 BC. Aemilius Paulus commands the Roman armies against the Illyrians under Demetrius of Pharos inflicting multiple Illyrian defeats. This causes Demetrius to flee to Macedonia thus ending the Second Illyrian War

=== 2nd century BC ===
Collapse of southern Illyrian nations and the start of Roman campaigns against Illyrian interior

- 183 BC. Philip V of Macedon makes an alliance with the Bastarnae to settle in Dardanian territory and wipe out the Dardanians. Philips plan fails, Bastarnae raid Dardanian territory but do not settle and go back.
- 181 BC. The Histri attempt to prevent the Romans from building Aquileia to no avail. Shortly after this Epulon becomes ruler of the Histri and unites much of Histria ruling from Nesactium.
- 180 BC. Dalmatians declares themselves independent from the rule of Gentius, king of the Ardiaei.
- 177 BC. Istrian Peninsula captured by Romans by diverting a river which protected Epulon's stronghold Nesactium, and provided it with water. Last stand of the Histri.
- 170 BC. Gentius and Perseus of Macedonia start forming alliance to counter the Romans
- 168 BC. Romans defeat Gentius at the Ardiaean capital Skodra bringing an end to the Illyrian kingdom. King Gentius brought to Rome as a prisoner
- 155 BC. Romans destroy the Dalmatian capital Delminium
- 119 BC. Pannonians defeated by Romans in Siscia

=== 1st century BC ===
• 97 BC. Beginning of the Roman-Dardanian wars

- 76 BC. Final defeat of the Dalmatians with the capture of the city port of Salona
- 75-73 BC. Bellum Dardanicum
- 51 BC. Delmatae defeat Liburnians, Roman main allies and clients on the Adriatic. Because of this conflict Delmatae will join Pompey in the civil war while Liburnians would support Caesar with their navies. Iapodes use the entire situation to slip away from Roman control and stop paying tribute for several decades.
- 49 BC. Liburnian communities take different sides in the civil war against Caesar and Pompey near the island of Krk
- 48 BC. Cornificius and Gabinus ambushed by Dalmatae during their return from campaign
- 39 BC. Gaius Asinius Pollio against Partheni, Illyrian defeat
- 35 BC. Octavius against Pannonians in Siscia, Illyrian defeat
- 34 BC. Iapydes finally conquered by the Romans under Octavius Augustus.
- 28 BC. Dardani get annexed into the Roman Empire. Dardania becomes a Roman province
- 9 BC. Tiberius (since 12 BC) and Scordisci against Illyrians in Dalmatia, Illyrian defeat

=== 1st century AD ===
- 6 AD. The Daesitiates under their ruler Bato I start the Great Illyrian uprising also known as Bellum Batonianum. After initial successes against the Romans, the insurrection spreads.
- 7 AD. Caecina Severus defeats the Daesitiates and Breuci. Despite their defeat, the Illyrians inflict heavy casualties at the Battle of Sirmium and are later strengthened when more Illyrian tribes join the rebellion.
- 7 AD. Three Roman generals and legionaries sent to defeat the massive Illyrian army.
- 8 AD. Bato II surrenders his forces to Tiberius.
- 9 AD. After fierce fighting, Bato I surrenders to the Romans marking the last Illyrian attempt for independence.

== See also ==
- Celtic warfare
- Dacian warfare
- Great Illyrian Revolt
- Illyrians
- Illyrian Wars
- Illyrian weaponry
- List of ancient tribes in Illyria
- List of rulers of Illyria
- Prehistoric Balkans
- Sica
- Sibyna
- Thracian warfare

== Bibliography ==
- Berranger, Danièle; Cabanes, Pierre; Berranger-Auserve, Danièle (2007). Épire, Illyrie, Macédoine: Mélanges Offerts au Professeur Pierre Cabanes. Clermont-Ferrand, France: Presses Universitaires Blaise Pascal. ISBN 978-2-84516-351-5.
- Hammond, Nicholas Geoffrey Lemprière (1993). Studies concerning Epirus and Macedonia before Alexander. Amsterdam, the Netherlands: Adolf M. Hakkert. ISBN 9789025610500.
- Kipfer, Barbara Ann (2000). Encyclopedic Dictionary of Archaeology. New York, New York: Kluwer Academic/Plenum Publishers. ISBN 0-306-46158-7.
- Lewis, D. M.; Boardman, John (1994). The Cambridge Ancient History (Volume 6): The Fourth Century B.C. Cambridge University Press. ISBN 0-521-23348-8.
- Papazoglu, Fanula (1978). The Central Balkan Tribes in Pre-Roman Times: Triballi, Autariatae, Dardanians, Scordisci and Moesians. Amsterdam, the Netherlands: Adolf M. Hakkert. ISBN 90-256-0793-4.
- Stipčević, Alexander (1989). Iliri: povijest, život, kultura. Zagreb: Školska knjiga. ISBN 9788603991062.
- Wilkes, John J. (1969). History of the Provinces of the Roman Empire. London, United Kingdom: Routledge and Kegan Paul.
- Wilkes, John J. (1995). The Illyrians. Oxford: Blackwell Publishing. ISBN 0-631-19807-5.
