= Bardil =

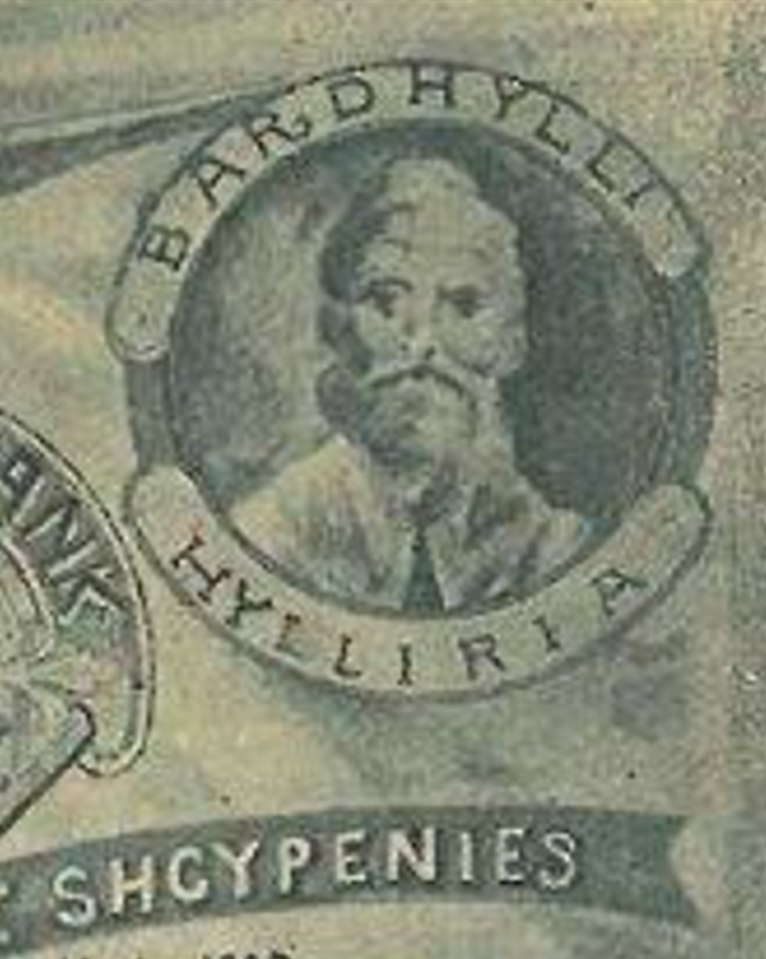
- King Bardylis of Illyria (Albanian State Franc Banknotes 1905 - 1915)
- Gender: Masculine and feminine
- Language: Proto-Germanic, Old High German

Origin
- Language: Proto-Germanic
- Derivation: From proto-Germanic "bardaz" and "bardō"
- Meaning: Little beard
- Region of origin: Northern Europe

Other names
- Variant forms: Bardol, Bardul, Bardle, Bardal, Bardilo, Bartilo, Barzilo, Bartol, Barðill, Barðall, Bǫrðull, Barðla
- Pet names: Bardo, Barto, Bard, Bart, Bar, Bardy, Bardz, Bardie, Barde, Barth, Bardé, Bardels, Bardles
- Related names: Bartholf, Bardolph, Bardin, Barten, Bardon, Bardonneau, Bardouleau, Bardelle, Bardillon, Barding, Beard, Bardeline

Bardil (plural: Bardila) is a Germanic given name and surname. It is of ancient European origins that evolved from words meaning "axe", “white, bright, brilliant,” "giant," or "beard."

The earliest known man with the name was Bardylis I (born c. 448 BC). Though it is a Latinized Illyrian name, the Germanic Bardil is not inherited nor borrowed in the Illyrian language. It may possibly be referenced to the archaeological depiction of axes in Illyrian weaponry and Bardylis and his soldiers, who possibly had a beard.

The name is attested alongside the archaic Lithuanian hypocoristic name (nickname) Bardzila and its Slavic variants Bordzilo and Burdzilo, all of which are derived from Bardys.

== Origins ==
=== Ancient words ===
Bardil was first attested in the Old High German language as “Bardilo" in the 9th century AD. The name derives from Old English "bardouleau" or "bardelle", Old French "bartel", and Old Norse "barðill," by evolution of proto-Germanic "bardaz" (meaning "beard") and "bardō" (meaning "axe").

== Variations ==
=== Other languages ===
Bardilo > Bardel (later)
English	French	Dutch	German	Danish	Norwegian	Swedish	Finnish	Icelandic	Russian	Latvian
Bardel	Bardél	Bardel	Bardel	Bardel	Bardel	Bardel	Bardel	Bardel	Бардель	Bordehl
Bardal	Bardal	Bardal	Bardal	Bårdel	Bårdel	Bårdel	Bårdel	Bárdel	Bardel	
Bardle	Bardele		Bartel	Bærtel	Bærtel	Bärtel	Bärtel	Bærtel		
			Bardil							

=== Other forms ===
English	French	Spanish	Italian	Greek	Albanian	Illyrian	Romanian	German	Hungarian	Dutch	Danish	Polish	Lithuanian	Belarusian	Russian	Ukrainian
Bard(e, o)	Bardin	Bartolino	Bardella	Βάρδυλις	Bardhyl	Bardylis	Bârzilă	Bardolf	Bardülisz	Bartelzoon	Bærtelsen	Bordziło	Bardzila	Бардзіла	Бордзило	Бордзіло
Beard	Bardon	Bordelína	Bardelle		Bardhyll	Bardyllis		Bartholf				Bordziłowski	Bardzilauskas	Bardzila	Bordzilo	Bordzilo
Bardell	Bardonneau				Bardhill			Barding				Bordiło		Бардзілоўскі	Бордзиловский	Бордзіловський
Barden	Bardouleau				Bardhull			Bordelius (Latin)				Bordiłowski		Bardziloŭski	Bordzilovskiy	Bordzilovsʹkyy
Bardolph	Bardéline							Bartelsohn				Borziło		Барзіла	Бордило	Борділо
Bardon	Bardelais											Borziłowicz		Barzila	Bordilo	Bordilo
Bardeline														Барзіловіч	Бордиловский	Борділовський
Bardillon														Barzilovič	Bordilovskiy	Bordilovsʹkyy
															Барзило	Барзіло
															Barzilo	Barzilo
															Барзилович	Барзілович
															Barzilovich	
