= Khirbet el-Maqatir =

Archaeological site in the West Bank

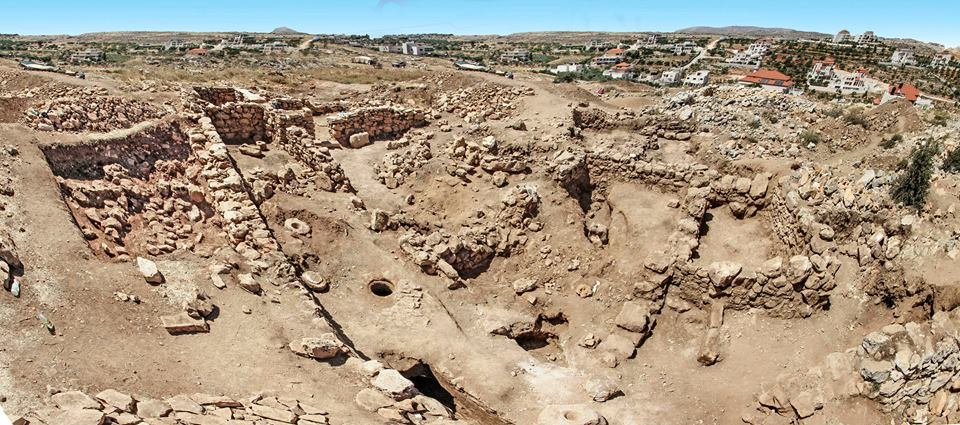
- Aerial view (2015)
- Interactive map of Khirbet el-Maqatir
- 31°54′54″N 35°14′59″E
- Type: Settlement, ecclesiastical complex
- Periods: Middle Bronze Age, Late Bronze Age, Iron Age, Hellenistic period, Early Roman Empire period, Byzantine period, Early Islamic period
- Cultures: Canaanite, Israelite/Jewish, Byzantine Christian, Early Islamic
- Location: Deir Dibwan, West Bank
- Region: Northern Judaean Mountains

History
- Abandoned: 68/69 CE (Jewish village); 749 CE (Byzantine complex)
- Event(s): First Jewish Revolt; Bar Kokhba Revolt; 749 earthquake

Site notes
- Elevation: 890 m (2,920 ft)
- Condition: Ruined

Khirbet el-Maqatir is an archaeological site located in the central West Bank, between Deir Dibwan and Beitin. Occupation began with a fortified settlement in the Middle and Late Bronze Ages, followed by an Iron Age highland village. After a lengthy abandonment following the Babylonian conquest of Judah, the site was resettled during the Second Temple period, when it flourished as a Jewish village until its destruction during the First Jewish Revolt. A Byzantine ecclesiastical complex was later established on a neighboring hill to the northwest. It remained in use into the early Islamic period before being abandoned after the earthquake of 749.

Notable remains include a Bronze Age fortified enclosure destroyed by fire during the 15th century BCE; an Iron Age village built partly into the earlier fortifications with remains such as a Hebrew-inscribed potsherd and an Egyptian scarab; and a late Hellenistic–early Roman Jewish settlement with dwellings, multiple mik'vaot (Jewish ritual baths), an olive press cave, winepresses, storage caves, cisterns, a monumental tower, a large courtyard house with a private bathhouse, a kokhim tomb, and an underground hiding complex reused during both Jewish revolts against Rome. Military finds include ballista stones, arrowheads, hobnails, and revolt coinage. The Byzantine ecclesiastical complex, comprising a tri-apsal basilica with a vaulted crypt, an adjoining coenobitic monastery, mosaics, Greek inscriptions, and agricultural installations, was repeatedly expanded between the 4th and 6th centuries.

The site first attracted scholarly attention in 1838 when the inhabitants of Taybeh identified it to Edward Robinson as the biblical city of Ai. This identification is today supported by archaeologists including Bryant Wood, although most scholars instead identify nearby et-Tell as Ai. After surveys by several 19th- and early 20th-century explorers, excavations were conducted by the Associates for Biblical Research between 1998 and 2016.

== Location ==
Khirbet el-Maqatir is situated in the central West Bank (part of Area C), approximately 15 kilometers north of Jerusalem and immediately east of Highway 60. The modern village of Beitin (often identified with the ancient Bethel) is located 1.6 kilometers to the northwest, while the village of Deir Dibwan is immediately to the east. The archaeological site of et-Tell is located 1 kilometer to the east. The hilltop occupied by the Byzantine-era complex rises to approximately 890 meters above sea level, while the late Second Temple-era settlement extended across lower ground to the southeast.

== Bronze and Iron Ages ==
The earliest period of significant occupation (Stratum 7) dates to the Middle Bronze Age IIIA through the Late Bronze IB, approximately 1650 to 1406 BCE, followed by an abandonment phase until renewed settlement during Iron Age I-IIB (Stratum 6), approximately 1187 to 701 BCE.

=== Bronze Age fortress ===
The remains of a small, fortified structure dating to the Middle Bronze Age III–Late Bronze Age I periods were found in Khirbet el-Maqatir. They occupy roughly one hectare on the site's southeast slope. Despite its modest footprint, the fortress had unusually thick walls, around four meters at the north and west sides. Excavation of the surrounding land is currently restricted by an enclosed farm plot.

A gate on the north side, though largely stripped of stone in antiquity, appears from surviving evidence to have originally had four chambers. Nearby, excavators found a small infant burial in a jar, accompanied by several vessels, dated to the transition between the two building phases. Two scarabs and a small bronze ram's head recovered from the gate area; Additionally, one scarab locally made, according to stylistic analysis, support a founding date in the MB III period. A possible tower was identified on the south side of the fortress, with excavators proposing a symmetrical companion tower based on the building's layout, though this remains unconfirmed due to restricted access.

The fortress was destroyed in a violent end: burned and cracked bedrock, ash layers, and scorched pottery indicate a major fire, with associated Late Bronze IB pottery and a second, precisely dated scarab pointing to a destruction date in the later 15th century BCE. Ceramic evidence points to a roughly two-century gap in occupation after the fortress fell out of use, before the site was resettled in Iron Age I. Later farmers clearing the land inadvertently buried the earlier Iron Age structures under a stone ridge, which also preserved pottery from multiple periods.

=== Iron Age settlement ===
During Iron Age I, Khirbet el-Maqatir was a small, poor, and largely self-sufficient agricultural village of roughly 35 to 40 inhabitants, located alongside other early Israelite highland settlement sites. Its material profile points to a community still in transition from a nomadic to a settled way of life, perhaps occupying the site only periodically. The inhabitants built their houses directly into the ruined northern wall of the earlier Bronze Age fortifications, recycling its cobble core as building material and adding partitions to create casemate-like rooms. Construction was entirely in stone, with no mudbrick superstructure, as at the nearby contemporary sites of et-Tell and Khirbet Raddana. The houses are small and simple relative to comparable sites of the period, following the broadroom-and-courtyard plan inherited from the Bronze Age rather than developing into the three- or four-room Israelite house that emerged elsewhere at this time; they lack pillars and shared exterior walls. The fully developed Israelite house plan appears in the immediate vicinity only at Khirbet ed-Dawwara.

The ceramic assemblage is utilitarian and typical of central-highland settlement sites: a narrow range of coarse, "poorly fired and mostly undecorated" forms with wide variability, reflecting, according to Boyd Seevers, "localized production in a decentralized society". No imported or Philistine wares were identified. Of more than 1,100 Iron Age sherds, roughly 93 percent date to Iron Age I, pointing to a major abandonment around the transition to Iron Age II, with only limited activity continuing into Iron Age IIC. Notable finds include a handmade collar-rim pithos set into a house floor as a fixed installation; an Iron Age I sherd inscribed with the Hebrew letter aleph in a script style characteristic of Iron Age II; and an Egyptian scarab bearing the name Psametik. Faunal analysis of Iron Age bone assemblages shows a dominance of sheep and goat, together accounting for three quarters of identified specimens, followed by cattle, dogs, chickens, and donkeys, with hunted species forming a small remainder. As is common at highland settlement sites, pig bones comprised under one percent of the assemblage.

After approximately 586 BCE, the site was abandoned for several centuries, likely as a consequence of Nebuchadnezzar's conquest of the Kingdom of Judah and the subsequent exile to Babylonia.

== Early Hellenistic period ==
A small Jewish population resettled the site around 290 BCE. No architectural remains from this occupational period (Stratum 5) survived intact, though some of the site's silos and cisterns may date to this stratum. Coins from this era include a worn silver coin dating to the 4th century BCE with the name Yehizkiyah written in the Paleo-Hebrew script; coins issued by the Ptolemaic kings Ptolemy I Soter, Ptolemy II Philadelphus, and Ptolemy III Euergetes; and 43 coins of Antiochus III the Great, the Seleucid ruler who wrested the region from Ptolemaic control during the Fifth Syrian War.

== Late Hellenistic and early Roman periods ==
=== Occupational levels ===
Settlement at the site is continuously attested from the Hasmonean period until its destruction during the First Jewish Revolt, in 68–69 CE. The earliest clearly recognizable architectural remains since the Iron Age appear in Stratum 4, dated to approximately 100–31 BCE. They include dwellings, three or four mik'vaot (Jewish ritual baths), and an olive press cave. Findings from this era include the first appearance of chalkstone vessels at the site; additionally, a coin of Antiochus III, was recovered from the plaster of one mikveh despite being centuries older.

The next phase in the village's history is Stratum 3c, approximately 31 BCE to 10 CE, the end of which is marked by several coins of ethnarch Herod Archelaus that date to the close of this period. A large residential building in the center of the village, preserved in places to a height of 1.75 meters, required renovation in the Herodian period, perhaps following the earthquakes of 31 and 27 BCE, which were recorded by Josephus. Several earlier walls, dating from the late Hellenistic era, were razed to floor levels and sealed beneath flagstone paving laid as part of post-earthquake reconstruction in the early 1st century CE.

==== Jewish–Roman Wars ====
The village met a violent end in 68/69 CE, during Legio X Fretensis's campaign through the Bethel Hills on its march to suppress the revolt in Jerusalem, in the middle of the First Jewish Revolt, approximately one year before the destruction of Jerusalem by Titus. The destruction and abandonment during that time are attested by First Jewish Revolt coinage that ceases abruptly around 68/69 and by radiocarbon analysis of charcoal pointing with strong probability to the mid-to-late first century CE. Evidence for destruction includes a 5 centimeter thick ash layer discovered in several areas of the site, broken jars on the northern tower's floor, an intact Herodian lamp on the floor of the central residence, and an arrowhead lodged in the wall of the tower's entrance just above an in situ door socket.

Of 1,322 coins recovered across the site, 75 dated to the first century CE prior to the revolt, 52 to the revolt's second year (April 67–March 68), and ten to the third year (68/69). This concentration suggests either a sharp population increase or money hoarding during Vespasian's campaign of the area. Archaeologist Evgeny Aharonovich has suggested that the site, together with the nearby villages at Khirbet Kafr Mur and Beitin, resisted the Roman advance, as they all share destruction layers dating to the third year of the revolt. It has been proposed that the site may correspond to Ephraim, a settlement Josephus mentions in The Jewish War as a place near Bethel where Vespasian stationed troops.

After 69 CE, the numismatic sequence breaks until a silver denarius of Trajan dated 114–117 CE. Coins recovered from the hiding complex include a Tyrian bronze of 93/94–195/196 CE, two coins of Trajan, and a small bronze restruck by the rebel administration during the third year of the Bar Kokhba Revolt (c. 134/135 CE). The latter bears the Hebrew legend "for the freedom of Jerusalem" alongside the name Shimon, and serves as evidence for Shimon bar Kokhba's control of the northern Judaean Mountains. Together these finds indicate that the hiding complex was in use during the Bar Kokhba Revolt, even as the village itself appears to have remained largely uninhabited.

=== Layout and construction ===
Builders used fieldstones of various sizes, while doorways were framed with semi-worked fieldstones or worked stone jambs. One in situ threshold of hard limestone resembles the mizzi yahudi stone commonly used in the region. Floors were of flagstone paving or beaten earth, while most roofs were flat wattle and daub construction, though some did use roof tiles. A fenestrated wall of a type common in the region during the early Roman period was preserved to a height over 1.5 meters. A stone etching discovered at the site appears to depict the village's plan, including walls in an L-shaped configuration and two or three buildings, seemingly predating the monumental tower. The settlement reached its apex in Stratum 3b, approximately 10 to 69 CE.

=== Monumental tower ===
Among the remains from this period is a large monumental tower that stood until its destruction during the First Jewish Revolt. The predominance of Jannaeus-type Hasmonean coins among those recovered from the structure (92 of 145) suggests it may have been built as early as 80 BCE. It abutted the perimeter wall rather than interlocking with it, indicating it was a later addition to an already-standing village wall. With a base of 28 x 16 meters, it is the largest known tower of its era west of the Jordan River, exceeding in size both the Phasael Tower in Jerusalem and Herodium's central tower. Its interior walls reached 2.5 meters at their thickest, with an outer wall of 1.4 meters, and it was constructed of megaliths, semi-hewn stones, and cobblestones. A subterranean pit, two Herodian storage jars at floor level, and a small tabun oven within the structure point to non-military use alongside any defensive function.

=== Courtyard house ===
The principal residential structure was an unroofed central courtyard surrounded by several rooms. A fenestrated wall divided two of the western rooms. One chamber preserved a floor sealing an earlier silo containing coins datable to the First Jewish Revolt; another yielded an in situ cooking pot of an early Roman type attested at Magdala, Gamla, Capernaum, Jerusalem, and Masada. A wine storage room contained a plastered silo with a red and white mosaic floor, fed by a rock-cut channel that may have conducted grape juice from a crushing area. One section of the house functioned as a small private bathhouse, with two parallel stepped pools connected by a tunnel 3.5 meters long running beneath the adjacent street; one pool served as a frigidarium (possibly later reused as a mikveh) while the other received heat from a caldarium, from which hypocaust pillars were recovered out of context.

=== Rock-cut installations ===
A total of 43 subterranean installations from the Hellenistic and early Roman period were documented at the site, including silos, cisterns, mikvehs, storage cellars, an olive press cave, a wine vat, a hiding complex, and a tomb. Many bottom elevations clustered around 872 meters, where builders likely encountered the transition from the softer Aminadav limestone to a harder dolomite.

The underground hiding complex comprised three connected chambers: a converted olive press cave, a large cistern, and a small inner chamber accessible by tunnel, whose walls were lined with eight oil lamp niches. Its construction involved blocking the cave's entrance with a stone wall pierced by a narrow crawl space, cutting a concealed passage into the cistern to allow water to be drawn unseen, and quarrying a tunnel into a further cavern fitted with a stone plate that could seal the innermost room from within. Excavations recovered coins from both major Jewish revolts alongside disarticulated human remains radiocarbon-dated to the first century CE, interpreted as those of Jewish refugees from the First Jewish Revolt; fragmentary remains from an adjacent cavern may belong to either revolt. Refugees of the Bar Kokhba revolt who later sheltered in the same complex may have been unaware of the bones of First Jewish Revolt refugees buried beneath them.

Three mik'vaot dating from the late Second Temple period were excavated at the site. One of them had a fill dated through its latest coin to the First Jewish Revolt's second year. Another one, #3, yielded 21 coins, two flint blades, and stone vessel fragments. Within a repurposed western chamber of the Bronze Age city gate, a winepress operated during Strata 4 and 3. On the village's eastern fringe, an underground olive press cave was found. It was flanked by two mik'vaot, possibly indicating production of oil in ritual purity for use in the Temple in Jerusalem.

A rock-cut tomb with kokhim (burial niches) was found approximately 100 meters southwest of the settlement. It includes a single chamber, containing seven loculi and the remains of at least eighteen individuals ranging in age from 4 to over 50 years, as determined by dental analysis. Tool-mark and stroke-pattern analysis identified at least three masons involved in the hewing, with two kokhim left unfinished where a chert vein interrupted the bedrock.

=== Other finds ===
Four ceramic jar stands were recovered from early Roman contexts, with three of them bearing a single Hebrew character. These inscriptions parallel an inscribed stand found in the Jewish Quarter of the Old City of Jerusalem. The isolated characters most likely served as designations for the commodity or quantity stored in the jar. Two stands carried a Hebrew het. A third stand carried a single lamed, possibly a short for the Hebrew word log, an ancient Jewish unit of volume. Several incised potsherds were also found, such as a Late Hellenistic sherd with a clear tsade in the first-century BCE script.

Several categories of military artifacts were discovered at the site. The assemblage broadly supports a Roman assault during the First Jewish Revolt, a subsequent garrison presence, and later reoccupation by Jewish rebels before the Bar Kokhba Revolt. A total of 55 hobnails were documented. The best preserved examples date most probably to 40–80 CE. The heaviest concentration came from the central first-century dwelling, suggesting use by the Roman garrison after the siege.

Some 300 rounded stone balls were recovered across multiple strata. Two exceeded the 655-gram threshold indicating ballista use. The larger, at 1.96 kg, corresponds to a 6-libra caliber listed by the Roman military engineer Vitruvius. A second ball of approximately 1 kg fits a 3-libra caliber. Both weights align with calibers associated with Legio V Macedonica and Legio XV Apollinaris, the two western legions known to have operated in the region during the First Jewish Revolt. Five arrowheads were recovered, four of which are Roman bodkin-tanged types, comparable to items found at Gamla, Magdala, Meroth, and the City of David. Their armor piercing design is considered anomalous, given that Jewish rebels were typically unarmored, and none of the more common trilobate-tanged arrowheads, dominant in First Jewish Revolt assemblages elsewhere, were found. One arrowhead was found alongside human remains, possibly fired by a Roman soldier at someone sheltering there.

A curved blade fragment may represent a sica, which is associated with the Jewish rebel group, the Sicarii. Only two other such blades have been identified in the region, from Qumran and Nahal David; the last is the closest parallel, retaining its handle-fastening pin and displaying a similar curvature and central rib. Two small flower-motif metal discs found in the central mansion are interpreted as possible non-standard harness phalerae; a comparable example is known from Samaria. A large iron buckle measuring 6.7 cm across matches the proportions of Roman saddle girth hardware, with a near-identical example found at Qumran.

== Byzantine period ==
During the 4th century CE, Byzantine Christians resettled the site established "one of the earliest known churches in Palestine" on a hill northwest of the ruined Second Temple period village. This new population, settling at the site following approximately a few centuries of abandonment, did not reoccupy the ruins but did terrace the southern part of the first-century settlement for agricultural purposes and scavenge its building material; one possible ossuary fragment was found in secondary use within the church.

Around 400 CE, two additional apses were added to the original mon-apsal structure, converting it into a tri-apsal basilica, and around 475 CE a monastery was added to its west. The complex underwent additional enlargement in the late 5th and 6th centuries, with damage possibly inflicted during the Samaritan revolt of 484 CE, and rebuilding under Justinian I attested by a coin hoard recovered beneath a basilica floor.

=== Architecture ===
The basilica measured 39.35 x 15.50 meters, with two rows of five pillars dividing a wide central nave from two flanking aisles. A vaulted crypt in front of the central apse supported a staircase rising approximately two meters to the bema floor, and two side rooms likely served as the prothesis for sacred vessels and the diaconicon for vestments and liturgical books. The roof was laid in tegulae-and-imbrex terracotta tiles, while the floors combined flagstone paving and mosaics. Six marble fragments, thought to belong to the altar, chancel screen and post, were recovered, along with green and brown glass fragments possibly from clerestory windows.

West of the basilica lay an atrium and entrance complex. The monastery's western chambers included plain rooms and a plastered installation that may have served as a baptistery or liquid storage vat. A walled agricultural terrace immediately north of the monastery provided horticultural produce, while nearby granary and oil and wine presses attest to the production of grain, olives, and grapes. A 2017 faunal study identified cattle, sheep, goats, and chickens as the principal domesticated animals.

=== Other finds ===
Smaller finds from this period include three sherds bearing Christian motifs, recovered on the hill where the ecclesiastical complex stood. One sherd, possibly from a broken vessel, carries a simple incised Byzantine cross with parallels in Khirbet ed-Deir, a nearby site of an ancient church; others feature Greek letters. The capital of a marble altar-post found in the complex's atrium bears an elaborate inscription: the visible letters A-P form part of the arrangement A-XP-Ω, combining Chi and Rho, the opening letters of the Greek word Christos (ΧΡΙΣΤΟΣ, "anointed") with Alpha and Omega, the first and last letters of the Greek alphabet, a standard Christian representation of Jesus as beginning and end.

== Early Islamic period ==
Following the Muslim conquest of the Levant after the Battle of the Yarmuk in 636 CE, the ecclesiastical complex continued in a reduced capacity, with a new wall blocking the original western entrance and the western sector apparently functioning as a squatter occupation, dwelling or farmstead. Excavations in this sector yielded a complete channel-nozzle oil lamp; additionally, two Islamic gold coins and glazed Islamic sherds came from elsewhere on the site. A small brass band with a simple coiled design was found in a layer otherwise dominated by classical-era pottery but probably dates to the Islamic period.

The 749 earthquake definitively ended habitation at the site.

== Research history ==
The site was first brought to scholarly attention in 1838, when Greek priests and residents from nearby Taybeh identified Khirbet el-Maqatir to biblical scholar Edward Robinson as the location of Ai, one of the cities besieged by the Israelites during their conquest of Canaan according to the Book of Joshua (chapters 7–8). Robinson was unpersuaded by the identification, but recognized the ecclesiastical remains at the site.

Archaeologist Victor Guérin paced the dimensions of the church in 1863, Charles Wilson took accurate measurements in 1866. In 1882, Claude Conder and Herbert Kitchener of the PEF published an outline plan in the Survey of Western Palestine. During a visit to Khirbet el-Maqatir in 1899, Ernst Sellin was told by local residents that the site was known as "Khirbet Ai." In 1934, Alfons Schneider conducted a more detailed survey, in which he tentatively identified the building as the Church of Jacob mentioned in the writings of the 4th–5th century Christian scholar Jerome.

Architect and archaeologist Leen Ritmeyer and photographer Michael Luddeni surveyed the upper ruins in 1998 on behalf of the Associates for Biblical Research, confirming that the remains belonged to an ecclesiastical complex roughly five times larger than the single church recorded by earlier visitors. Limited excavations directed by Bryant G. Wood of the Associates for Biblical Research with Todd Bolen as field leader were carried out in 1998 and 1999 but were soon curtailed by the Second Intifada. Wood proposes identifying Khirbet el-Maqatir, rather than the nearby site of et-Tell, as the biblical Ai.

Between 2010 and 2016, Scott Stripling conducted excavations of the church, monastery, and the village. Fieldwork stopped in 2016 after the council of the Palestinian village Deir Dibwan asked the archaeologists why permission to dig had not been sought from the council.

=== Identification ===
Both Edward Robinson (1838) and Ernst Sellin (1899) were told by locals that Khirbet el-Maqatir was the biblical city of Ai. Despite this, a different site soon became the accepted identification: in 1924, archaeologist William F. Albright proposed et-Tell, about 1 kilometers east of el-Maqatir. Later excavations there, however, found no Middle or Late Bronze Age occupation, the period in which the Ai of Joshua 7–8 is thought to have existed. Archaeologist Bryant Wood argues Khirbet el-Maqatir fits better, citing the size of the Bronze Age fortress, its northern gate, and the nearby valleys as matching the Joshua narrative. He instead connects et-Tell to an earlier, separate mention of Ai in Genesis 12:8 and 13:3, the story of Abraham, suggesting the name later transferred to the nearby fortress along the same route. The Byzantine-era church and monastery at Khirbet el-Maqatir, otherwise hard to explain given no known local Byzantine community, may likewise have served as a memorial to Abraham. In Wood's view, et-Tell represents Ai's during Abraham's era, and Khirbet el-Maqatir the Ai destroyed by Joshua.
