= Bryant G. Wood =

American archaeologist and Young Earth creationist

- Born: 1936 (age 89–90); Endicott, New York, U.S.
- Education: Syracuse University (BS); Rensselaer Polytechnic Institute (MS); University of Michigan (MA); University of Toronto (PhD)
- Known for: Reassessment of Garstang's and Kenyon's Jericho datings
- Scientific career
- Fields: Archaeology
- Workplaces: Editor of Bible and Spade

Bryant G. Wood (born 1936) is an American biblical archaeologist and Young Earth creationist. Wood is known for arguing that the destruction of Jericho could be accorded with the biblical literalist chronology of c. 1400 BC. This date is some 150 years later than the accepted date of c. 1550 BC, first determined by Kathleen Kenyon and subsequently confirmed with radiocarbon dating.

== Academic career ==
Wood attended Syracuse University, graduating with a B.S. in mechanical engineering, later earning an M.S. in mechanical engineering from Rensselaer Polytechnic Institute in Troy, New York. He later pursued biblical and archaeological studies and received an M.A. in Biblical History from the University of Michigan in 1974 and a PhD in Syro-Palestinian archaeology from the University of Toronto in 1985. Wood is a specialist in Canaanite pottery of the Late Bronze Age. He is the author of The Sociology of Pottery in Ancient Palestine: The Ceramic Industry and the Diffusion of Ceramic Style in the Bronze and Iron Ages (1990), as well as numerous articles on archaeological subjects. He received international attention for his proposed redating of ancient Jericho, arguing for the historicity of a biblically literalist account of the capture of the city by the Israelites. He has also written on the entry of the Philistines into Canaan and on the historicity of the Biblical story of Sodom and Gomorrah.

He is a member of the Board of Directors of the Near East Archaeological Society.

== Bible and Spade and other contributions ==
Wood serves as editor in chief of the quarterly publication Bible and Spade (published by the inerrantist organisation Associates for Biblical Research), which describes itself as "[a] Christian Apologetics Ministry Dedicated to Demonstrating the Historical Reliability of the Bible through Archaeological and Biblical Research". The magazine concentrates largely on matters relating to archaeology and Bible history, but also touches on general apologetics (especially the relationship between science and evangelical religious belief) and Christian devotion. Bible and Spade is a quarterly magazine committed to the use of archaeology to demonstrate the historical veracity of the Old and New Testaments. The editor-in-chief is listed as Wood. The headquarters is in Akron, PA.

It states its creationist commitment as follows:

- We believe the accounts found in Genesis 1–11 contain factual and real-time, chronology, historical events, places, and persons. This includes the accuracy and real historicity of the persons, ages, and events recorded in the genealogies of Genesis 5 and 11, which may or may not be exhaustive. These records incorporate the accounts of those who were eyewitnesses to the events recorded. We find no biblical, hermeneutical, or exegetical basis to interpret them allegorically, non-historically, or mythically. These accounts do not require knowledge of Ancient Near Eastern literature to be interpreted correctly. We deny that God used erroneous worldviews from ANE mythology to inspire the writing of Genesis 1–11.
- We consider the patriarchal narratives of Genesis 12–50 to be historically accurate in their reporting of chronology, persons, places, events, and cultural customs and background. Further, we believe that the extensive chronological data found in both the Old and New Testaments is historically accurate.

Wood is also a contributor to the Biblical Archaeology Review, the Israel Exploration Journal and the Near East Archaeological Society Bulletin.

== Jericho ==
During a series of excavations from 1930 to 1936 John Garstang found a destruction layer at Jericho corresponding to the termination of City IV which he identified with the biblical story of Joshua and dated to c. 1400 BC. It was therefore a shock when Kathleen Kenyon in the 1950s, using more scientific methods than had been available to Garstang, redated Jericho City IV to 1550 BC and found no signs of any habitation at all for the period around 1400 BC. Wood's 1990 reversion of City IV to Garstang's original 1400 BC therefore attracted considerable attention. Wood based his belief on the story in the biblical book of Joshua, Jericho was the first Canaanite city to fall to the Israelites as they began their conquest of the Promised Land - an event which Wood places at around 1406 BC due to his interpretation of 1 Kings 6:1. In 1999, based on a reanalysis of pottery shards, Wood argued that Jericho could have been captured in the Late Bronze Age by Joshua. Wood and Piotr Bienkowski debated this in the March/April 1990 issue of Biblical Archaeology Review, with Bienkowski writing:

Wood has attempted to redate the destruction of Jericho City IV from the end of the Middle Bronze Age (c. 1550 B.C.) to the end of the Late Bronze I (c. 1400 BC). He has put forward four lines of argument to support his conclusion. Not a single one of these arguments can stand up to scrutiny. On the contrary, there is strong evidence to confirm Kathleen Kenyon's dating of City IV to the Middle Bronze Age. Wood's attempt to equate the destruction of City IV with the Israelite conquest of Jericho must therefore be rejected.

Wood responded that he had produced evidence to back his argument, and that any counter-claims should also be backed by fresh evidence. In 1995 new evidence became available in the form of charred cereal grains from the City IV destruction layer. Radiocarbon dating of these grains showed that Jericho City IV was destroyed "during the late 17th or the 16th century BC", in line with Kenyon's findings, and that "the fortified Bronze Age city at Tell es-Sultan [Jericho] was not destroyed by ca.1400 BC, as Wood suggested". Wood responded to the newer evidence in an article for the Bible and Spade magazine, concluding that he still held to the date ca. 1400 B.C. based on pottery finds. Wood also argues that the discrepancy is part of the ongoing dispute between Egyptologists and radiocarbon experts that centers around the date of the Thera eruption. Kenyon's date is consensually accepted by mainstream archaeologists. William G. Dever dismissed Wood's theories stating: "Of course, for some, that only made the Biblical story more miraculous than ever—Joshua destroyed a city that wasn't even there!" According to Ann E. Killebrew, "Most scholars today accept that the majority of the conquest narratives in the book of Joshua are devoid of historical reality".

== Khirbet el-Maqatir ==
Wood directed excavations at Khirbet el-Maqatir, a city which he and his associates contend may be the biblical city of Ai. (The traditional location of Ai, et-Tell, was excavated most recently by Joseph Callaway and was found to have been abandoned during the entirety of the Middle Bronze and Late Bronze Ages.) Khirbet el-Maqatir has produced pottery of the Early Bronze, Middle Bronze, Late Bronze I, Iron Age I, late Hellenistic/early Roman, and Byzantine periods. Based on initial finds, including a small Late Bronze I fortress that was destroyed by fire - some two centuries earlier than the date usually considered for the events of Book of Joshua - their "preliminary conclusion is that the LB I fortress meets the Biblical requirements to be tentatively identified as the fortress Ai, referred to in Josh. 7–8." They see a nearby wadi as the hiding place of the Israelites before the ambush, and they have found that the fortress had a gate. These points fit the limited and commonplace topographic details ascribed to Ai in the Bible.

This identification has not gained acceptance. The present-day consensus is that there never was an Israelite conquest of Canaan.

== Personal life ==
Wood is an evangelical Christian. He supports biblical literalism and considers himself a Young Earth creationist. He is married to Faith Wood, and lives in Manheim, Pennsylvania.

== Works ==
=== Books ===
- Wood, Bryant G. (1985). Palestinian Pottery of the Late Bronze Age: an investigation of the terminal LB IIB phase. Ottawa: National Library of Canada. ISBN 978-0-3151-8831-0. OCLC 16020443.
- ——— (1987). The Palestinian Evidence for a Thirteenth Century Conquest: an archaeological appraisal. OCLC 861056373.
- ——— (1987). Egyptian Amphorae of the New Kingdom and Ramesside Period. Durham, NC: American Schools of Oriental Research. OCLC 77650066.
- ——— (1990). The Sociology of Pottery in Ancient Palestine: the ceramic industry and the diffusion of ceramic style in the Bronze and Iron Ages. Journal for the Study of the Old Testament, Supplement series. Vol. 103. Sheffield, England: JSOT Press for the American Schools of Oriental Research. ISBN 978-1-850-75269-1. OCLC 25358621.
- ——— (2008). The Search for Joshua's Ai. Critical Issues in Early Israelite History, eds. Richard S. Hess, Gerald A. Klingbeil, and Paul J. Ray. Winona Lake, IN: Eisenbrauns. ISBN 978-1-57506-804-6.

=== Articles ===
- ——— (March 1990). "Did the Israelites Conquer Jericho? A New Look at the Archaeological Evidence". Biblical Archaeology Review. 16 (2): 44–58.
- ——— (September 1990). "Dating Jericho's Destruction: Bienkowski Is Wrong on All Counts". Biblical Archaeology Review. 16 (5): 45–69.
- ——— (November 1991). "The Philistines Enter Canaan: Were They Egyptian Lackeys or Invading Conquerors?". Biblical Archaeology Review. 17 (6): 44–52, 89–92.
- ——— (Spring 1999). "The Walls of Jericho". Bible and Spade. 12 (2): 35–42.
- ——— (2000). "Khirbet el-Maqatir, 1995-1998". Israel Exploration Journal. 50 (1–2): 123–30.
- ——— (2000). "Khirbet el-Maqatir, 1999". Israel Exploration Journal. 50 (3): 249–54.
- ——— (2001). "Khirbet el-Maqatir, 2000". Israel Exploration Journal. 51 (1–2): 246–52.
- ——— (2011). "Digging up Joshua's Ai: The 2009-2010 Seasons at Kh. el-Maqatir". Bible and Spade. 24 (1): 10–16.
- ——— (2012). "Excavations at Khirbet el-Maqatir: The Infant Jar Burial". Bible and Spade. 25 (2): 37–38.
- Byers, Gary A.; Stripling, Scott; Wood, Bryant G. (2016). "Excavations at Khirbet el-Maqatir: the 2009-2011 Seasons". Judea and Samaria Research Studies. 25 (2): 69–109.PDF

== Bibliography ==
- Manfred Bietak and Felix Höflmayer, "Introduction: High and Low Chronology," pp. 13–23 in The Synchronization of Civilisations in the Eastern Mediterranean in the Second Millenium B.C. III, eds. Manfred Bietak and Ernst Czerny, Vienna: Österreichischen Akademie der Wissenschanften, 2007.
- Bruins & van der Plicht, "Tell es-Sultan (Jericho): Radiocarbon Results of Short-Lived Cereal and Multiyear Charcoal Samples from the End of the Middle Bronze Age," Radiocarbon 37:2, 1995.
- John Garstang, Joshua-Judges, Grand Rapids: Kregel, 1978 reprint of 1931 edition.
