= Illyrian weaponry =

Ancient European weapons

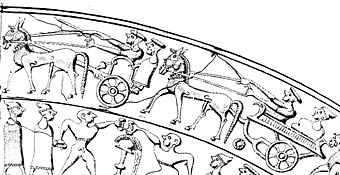
Illyrian chariots from Vace - 6th century BC

Illyrian weaponry played an important role in the makeup of Illyrian armies and in conflicts involving the Illyrians. Of all the ancients sources the most important and abundant writings are those of Ennius (239 -169 BC), a Roman poet of Messapian origin. Weapons of all sorts were also placed intact in the graves of Illyrian warriors and provide a detailed picture for archaeologists on the distribution and development of Illyrian weaponry.

== Shields ==
Shields were used among the Illyrians from the end of the Bronze Age, but very little is known about the early shields until the Iron Age. In this period, Illyrian shields were made of wood and leather and as a result no such example has survived. During the Iron Age a metal plate-cover was attached to the shields. The most common Illyrian shield was the circular shield, although northern Illyrians and the Japodes also used an oval or rectangular type. The circular shield was small, and was decorated with embedded circles and semicircles on the sides. It resembled the Macedonian shield of the time, but differed in the number of circles, which were a symbolic decoration. One of the best examples of the Illyrian circular shield, coated in bronze, was found in a Liburnian necropolis in Nin and dates from the 4th century BC. The circular shield was widely used from Glasinac in Bosnia to Albania. They are depicted on Illyrian city coins of Lezhë and Shkodër. Similar to the Illyrian oval shield in northern Illyria was the shield that the Celts brought with them during the Gallic invasion of the Balkans in the 4th-3rd centuries BC. The Celtic shield was wooden and oblong, with an iron boss.

== Breast armor ==
Breast armour was a rare and very interesting part of Illyrian armor. A type of breast-armor made of bronze plate was only used by northern Illyrians. Up to now only three of these have been discovered in Novo Mesto, Sticna-Verpole and St. Vid. All date before 500 BC. Other Illyrian did not use breast armor. Only the Glasinac Illyrians used a type of breast armor if breast armor can be considered a jacket made of cloth or leather with parts of bronze. Another form of body armor was a bronze pectoral that may have protected part of the back as well. It was more like a disc "breastplate" of 10 cm in diameter.

== Greaves ==
In the 7th century BC, bronze greaves were used by Illyrian warriors. It is possible that Illyrians used leather greaves in an earlier time, the same as those used by the Mycenaeans, but nothing is known about them. Bronze greaves first appear among the Illyrians in southern Illyria where examples have been found dating to the 7th century BC, and also from Glasinac from the same period. The bronze greaves discovered in a prince's grave in Gllasinac are interesting especially for the decorations depicted on them. Warships, circles and triangular motives are carved on the outer surfaces. The two last-mentioned decorations were believed to protect the warrior while in combat. Up to the Roman era bronze greaves were rarely used and only by wealthy warriors.

== Helmets ==
Helmets are found more abundantly in Illyrian graves because of their higher status. Bronze helmets were made by the northern Illyrian from the 7th century BC. At that time and probably earlier the conical helmet was used. Later in these areas the Shmarjet helmet, named after Shmarjet of Novo Mesto, was used by the Japodes.

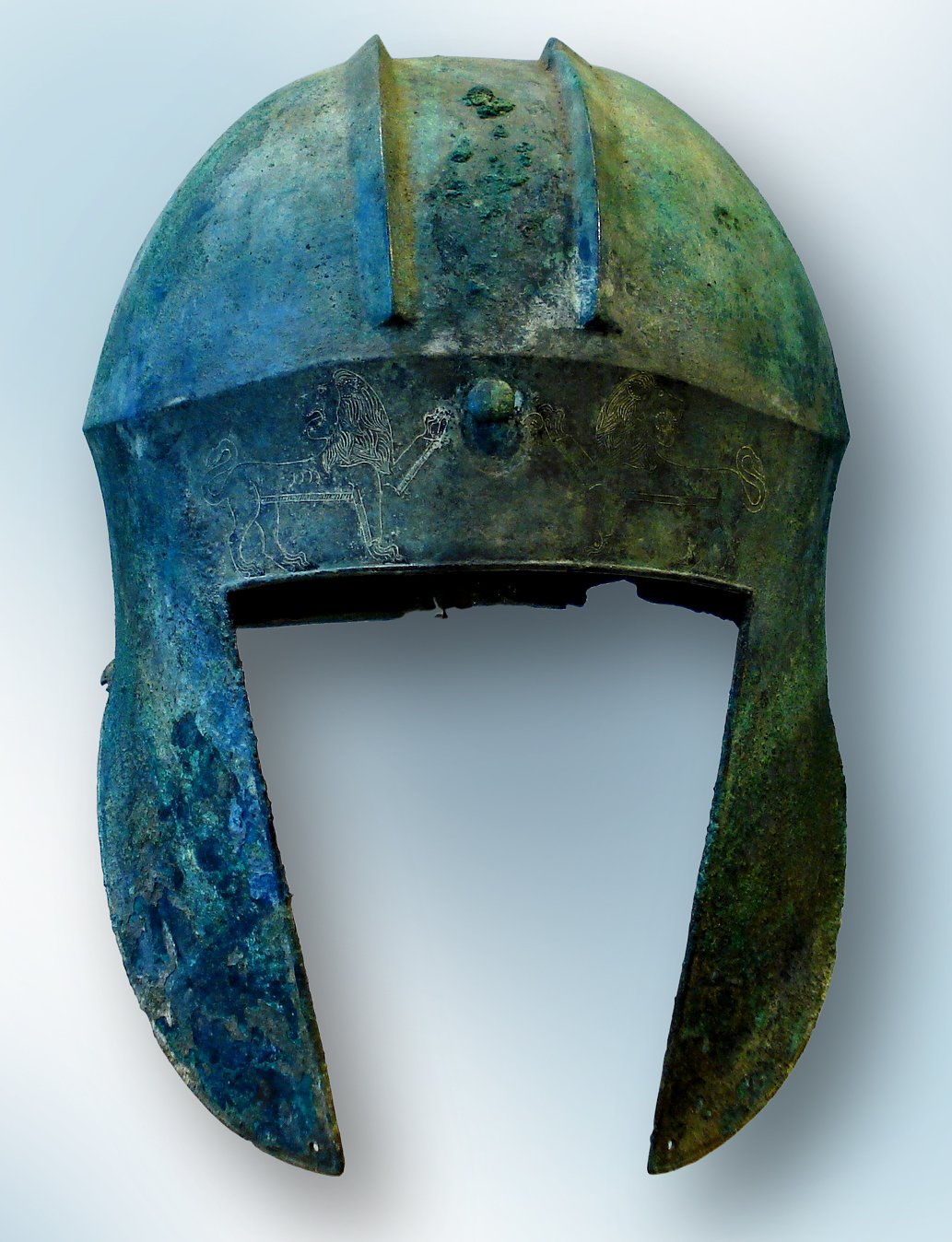
Illyrian helmet

This very interesting type of helmet was similar to the Japodian round caps. They were made from the skeletons of bushes and painted with clay. Round bronze discs and studs were often embedded around the helmet. There were two varieties, one with a wicker base and one sewn together with chain mail. Up to now thirty Shmarjet helmets have been found. Among the northern Illyrians the bronze helmet developed into the conical or pot helmet. The conical helmet was used in the 6th century BC and sometimes had a plume. From the 5th-4th century BC under the influence of the Etruscans and other Italic peoples, the Negau helmet was used also by the northern Illyrians. The Agrianes who were in close contact with the Macedons and Thracians used the Phrygian type helmet.

The most important and widespread helmet was the Illyrian helmet. Helmets of this type have been discovered in many sites in Albania, Bosnia, Croatia (near the coast), North Macedonia, Kosovo and Serbia. Many scientists date the oldest Illyrian helmets from the 7th century BC Greece and according to them later helmets found in southern Illyria also from the 7th century BC are imports from Greece. However, other experts, especially the Albanian archaeologist Hasan Ceka, present arguments in favor of the indigenous Illyrian helmet. According to Ceka the Illyrian helmet is an original Illyrian type of helmet dating from the 7th century BC and used up to the 2nd century BC, and not only up to the 4th century BC, as thought earlier. Proof of such late use is offered by depictions of the helmet on Illyrian coins, especially those of king Gentius. Helmets were a privilege limited to the minority of warriors who could afford or obtain them.

== Swords ==
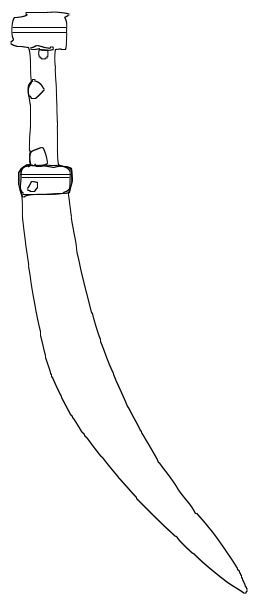
Sica, ancient weapon of the Illyrians

The main Illyrian fighting sword was the sica, a short single-edged curved sword used by the Thraex gladiators in the Roman world. The sica was developed during the Bronze Age and was similar to the Greek machaira. It was originally depicted as a curved sword with a blade about 16–18 inches (41–46 centimetres) long. The distinctive shape was designed to get around the sides of an opponent's shield in order to stab or slash him in the back. Although the sica was used by many peoples around the Balkans, the Romans regarded the sica as a distinctive Illyrian weapon, used as well by inhabitants of Dalmatia and present day Croatia, parts of Bosnia, Herzegovina and Albania. Another Illyrian sword type was the fighting-sword, which was 20–30 cm long. Short curved swords and long swords were also used. In addition, Illyrians used various knives.

== Spears ==
The Illyrians used the thrusting spears and the sibyna, which resembled a boar spear. The sibyna was a long, metallic spear and is commonly found all over Illyria, but especially in the necropolis of Bosnia.

== Other weaponry ==
The bow and arrow, used by Illyrians from the 2nd millennium BC, became an important weapon for the Illyrian infantry. Among the axes used were battle axes and single handed axes. Chariots were only known to be used by the Daunians and northern Illyrians in Slovenia from depictions on Daunian stele and Illyrian situla. They may have been widespread all over Illyria, but not a single one has been discovered.

== See also ==
- Illyrian warfare
- Ancient warfare
