= Roman–Dardanian wars =

- Part of the Roman Conquest of the Balkans
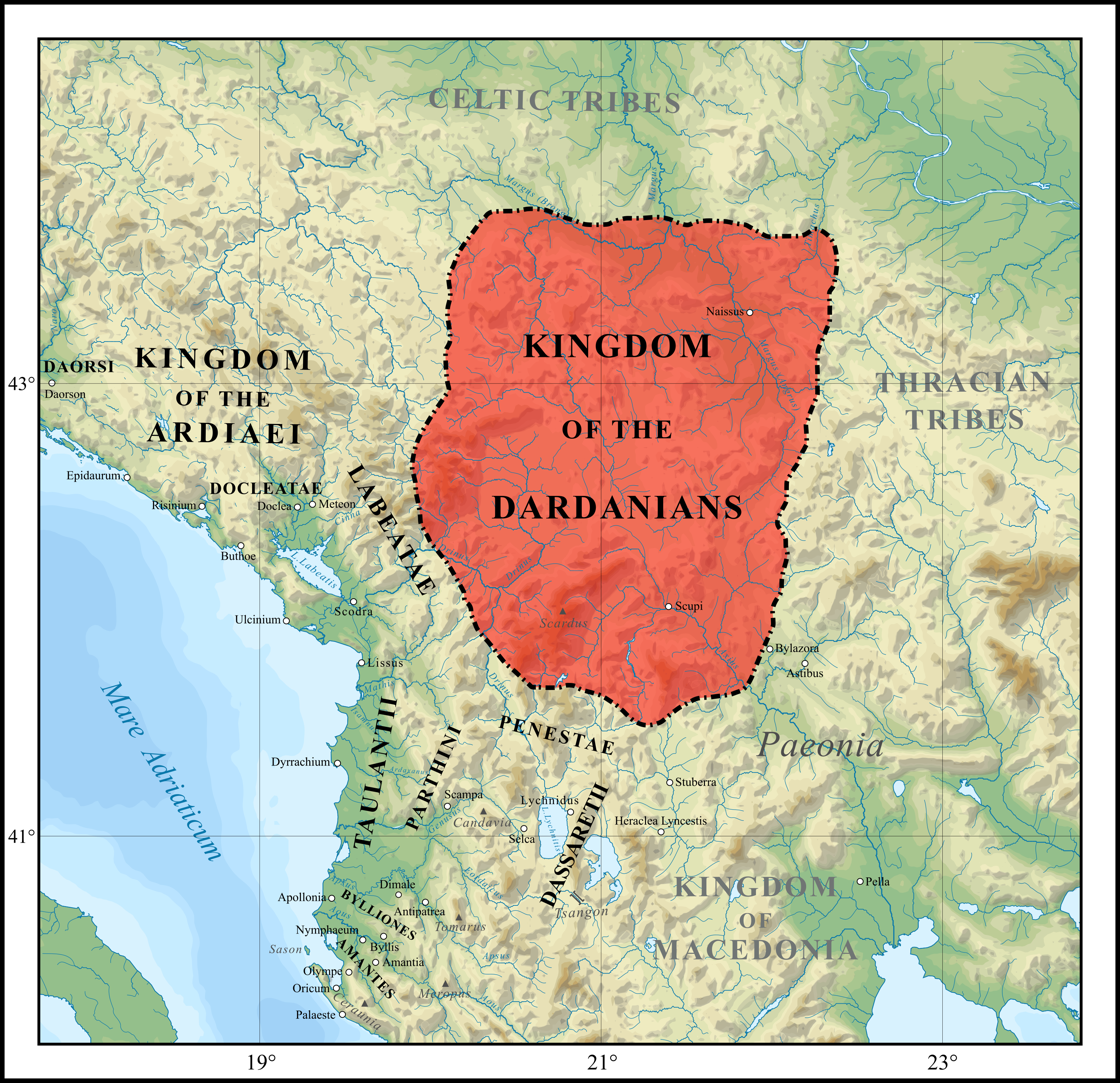
- The Kingdom of Dardania in the late 3rd century BC.
Date	97 BC – 28 BC
Location	Dardania, Balkans
Result	Eventual Roman victory

Belligerents
Kingdom of Dardania; Expeditions of 95–85 BC: Maedi	Roman Republic

Commanders and leaders
Unknown	Gaius Scribonius Curio; Marcus Terentius Varro Lucullus; Marcus Licinius Crassus

Strength
Unknown	Campaign of 76 BC: 4 legions

Casualties and losses
- Heavy on both sides Thousands of Dardanian civilians killed

The Roman–Dardanian wars were a series of conflicts between the Roman Republic and the Kingdom of Dardania, starting in 97 BC with the Roman expeditions against the Dardanian–Mede alliance. The Dardanians resisted Roman occupation until 28 BC after being fully conquered by Marcus Licinius Crassus in the Illyrian wars of Augustus.

== Background ==
For several decades the Dardani and the Roman Republic had enjoyed a period of peace with each other. They would eventually establish an alliance, which would last until 168 BC. The diplomatic ties between the two nations were severed after the Third Macedonian War, when the Romans did not return Paeonia, a region which had belonged to the Kingdom of Dardania but was later occupied by Macedon, to the Dardani. Instead the Roman senate only recognized the Dardani right to trade salt. Thereafter the Dardani, as sworn enemies of Rome, carried out several raids into Roman territory.

== Conflict ==
The fall of the Scordisci to the north made the Kingdom of Dardania exposed to Roman attacks. Thus the Dardanians formed an alliance with their eastern neighbors, the Maedi tribe, in 97 BC. The Romans led several expeditions between 97 BC - 85 BC against the Dardanian–Mede alliance however these expeditions were unsuccessful and the Romans suffered heavy losses. The second conflict between the Dardanians and the Romans occurred one year later in 84 BC, when a Balkan alliance was formed with the goal of raiding the Roman province of Macedon. The Dardani, as a part of this alliance plundered the Roman province all the way to Delphi. This raid led to the Dardanians becoming a major Roman target for future campaigns in the region.

The largest campaign, also known as Bellum Dardanicum, occurred in 76 BC, when Roman general Gaius Scribonius Curio organized an army of 5 legions to attack the Kingdom of Dardania, however before setting off on his campaign, one of the legions deserted the army in Dyrrachium. Scribonius invaded Dardania with his 4 legions, raiding and pillaging settlements as well as slaughtering thousands of Dardanian civilians. Ammianus Marcellinus uses the massacre of the Dardanians as something to compare Emperor Valentinian I's punishment of his army to. Curio eventually reached the Danube in 73 BC and was celebrated triumphantly in his return to Rome, however the Dardani were still not fully conquered, even though they lost most of their sovereignty. Another successful campaign against the Dardani occurred between the years of 72–71 BC under the command of Marcus Terentius Varro Lucullus. Despite this, the Dardani were still not fully conquered. They would carry out multiple raids and attacks on Roman territories between 71–29 BC before finally being fully conquered in an expedition commanded by Marcus Licinius Crassus in 28 BC.

== Aftermath ==
After being conquered by the Romans, the lands of the Kingdom of Dardania were incorporated in the province of Moesia. The province was later divided into Moesia Superior and Moesia Inferior. Moesia Superior later became known as the Province of Dardania.

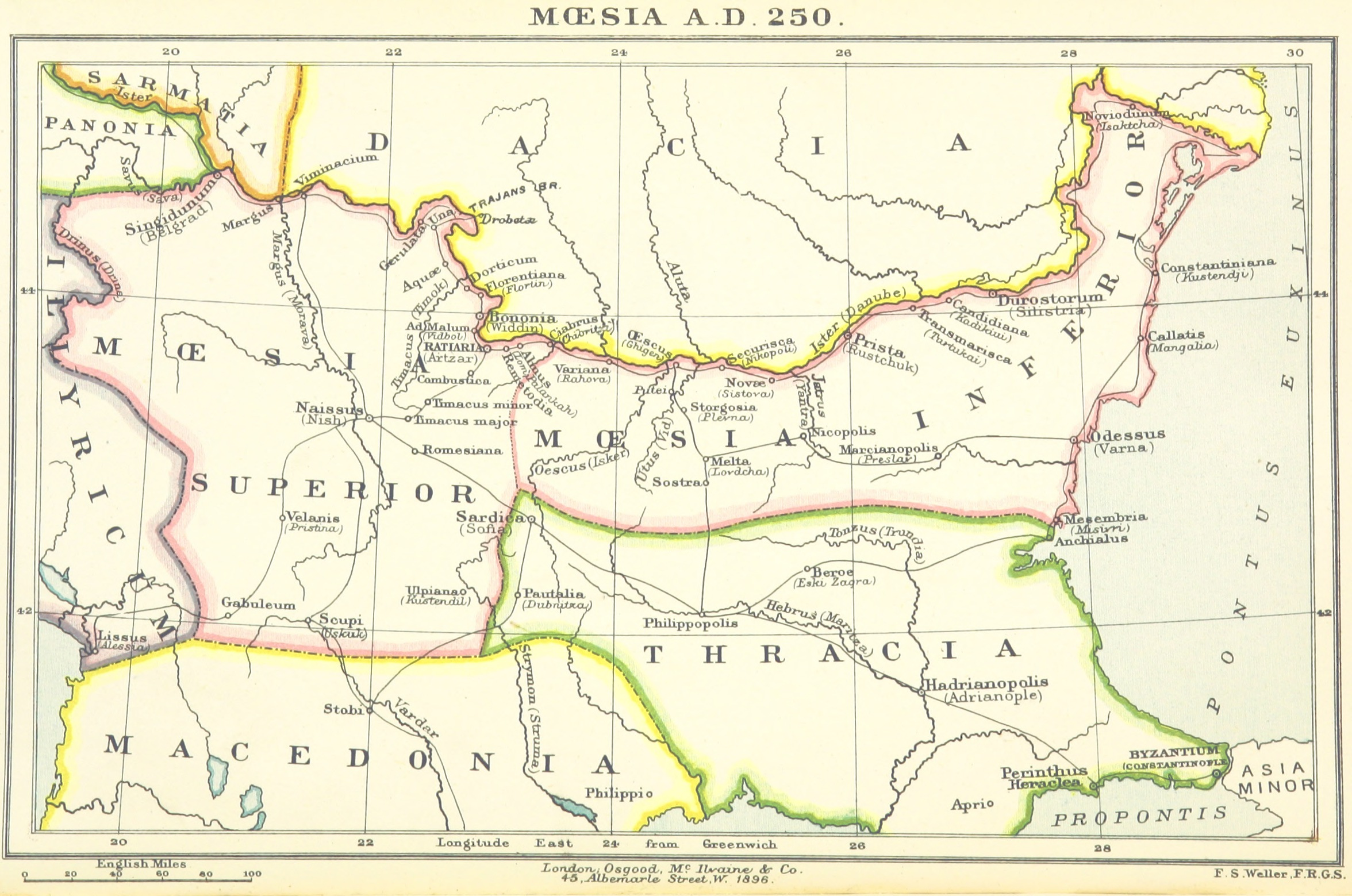
Roman Moesia in 250 AD, divided into the provinces of Moesia Superior to the west and Moesia Inferior to the east

== Sources ==
- Papazoglu, Fanula (1978). The Central Balkan Tribes in Pre-Roman Times: Triballi, Autariatae, Dardanians, Scordisci and Moesians. Amsterdam: Hakkert. ISBN 9789025607937.
- Alaj, Premtim (2019). Les habitats de l'Age du fer sur le territoire de l'actuel Kosovo (Thesis). Université de Lyon.
- Anamali, Skënder (2002). Historia e popullit shqiptar I, Mesjeta. Toena. ISBN 9789992716229. OCLC 52411919.
- Florus, Lucius Annaeus (1984). Epitome of Roman history. Harvard University Press. ISBN 0674992547.
- Broughton, T. R. S. (1952). The Magistrates of the Roman Republic, Volume II (99 B.C.–31 B.C.). New York: American Philological Association.
- Wilkes, John (2012). "Dardani". In Hornblower, Simon; Spawforth, Antony; Eidinow, Esther (eds.). The Oxford Classical Dictionary. OUP Oxford. ISBN 978-0-19-954556-8.
