= Sica =

Short sword or large dagger

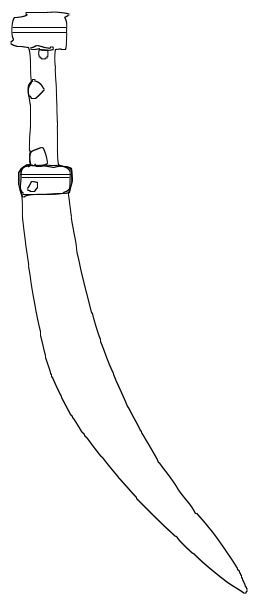
Outline of a sica

The sica (plural siccae) is a short sword or large dagger of ancient Illyrians, Thracians, and Dacians; it was also used in ancient Rome. It is a shorter form of the falx, and the root of the word is the same as the modern sickle.

It was originally depicted as a curved sword (see the Zliten mosaic as well as numerous oil lamps) and many examples have been found in what are today Croatia, Albania, Bosnia and Herzegovina, Bulgaria, Serbia, and Romania. It is also depicted on Trajan's Column; notably the Dacian king Decebalus is depicted committing suicide with one.

== Etymology ==
Possibly from Proto-Albanian tsikā (whence Albanian thikë, "knife"), from Proto-Indo-European ḱey- ("to sharpen") possibly via Illyrian. According to the Dictionnaire des Antiquités Grecques et Romaines, the name Sica comes from Proto-Indo-European root sek-, meaning "to cut", "to section", however De Vaan declares any connection to Proto-Indo-European sek- to be formally impossible.

== Illyrian ==
The Romans regarded the sica as a distinctive Illyrian weapon. The principal melee weapon of the Illyrians was the Sica. According to historian John Wilkes:

Although a short curved sword was used by several peoples around the Mediterranean the Romans regarded the sica as a distinct Illyrian weapon used by the stealthy 'assassin' (sicarius)

== Types ==
From a typological point of view, though there is a strong tendency towards standardization, the sica daggers can be organised in three main types that differ only by morphological aspects, not functional.

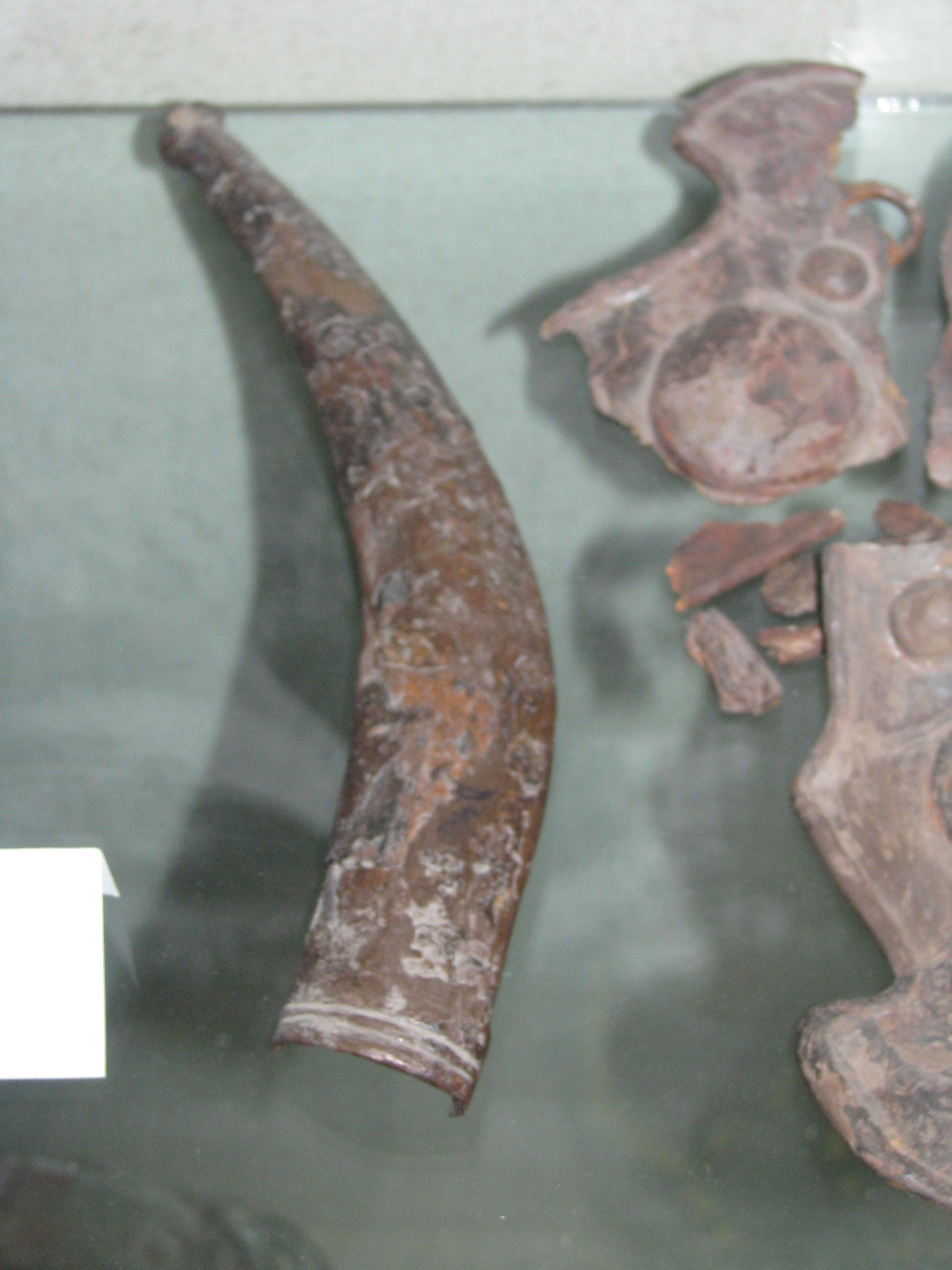
Scabbard for a sica from the Dacian warrior tomb of Cugir, dated 1st century BC. Fragments of the helmet and other inventory pieces are also seen on the right side. In display at the National Museum of the Union, Alba Iulia, Romania

The first type is characterized by its solidity, sometimes with a broken figure immediately after the blade's middle part, with a short and sharp point, with a slight curvature, a short handle cane, usually of a triangular shape, that has a hole for the fixing rivet, close to the blade. The blade has incised ornaments and a fuller deeply carved into it. These characteristics are not general, the only standing arguments for this type being the size and the shape approximately similar.

The second type, not very different morphologically speaking, does not have the solid shape of the first type, but a longer blade, with a fuller, and keeps, most often, the haft's tongue short and of a triangular shape.

The third type, more numerous, gathers a series of daggers characterized by a long blade, elegantly manufactured in most cases, by the ornamentation with incised circles and/or lines along the blade, the presence of the fuller, the haft's tongue as long as the haft and a guard muff. These distinctive elements are found either all together, or some of the pieces present one or more of these characteristic features. The sizes show a relative standardization, somewhere around 30–40 cm (12–16 in) in length and approximately 3 cm (1.2 in) in width. From a chronological point of view, this type of dagger is dated mostly in the 2nd and 1st centuries BC.

== Significance ==
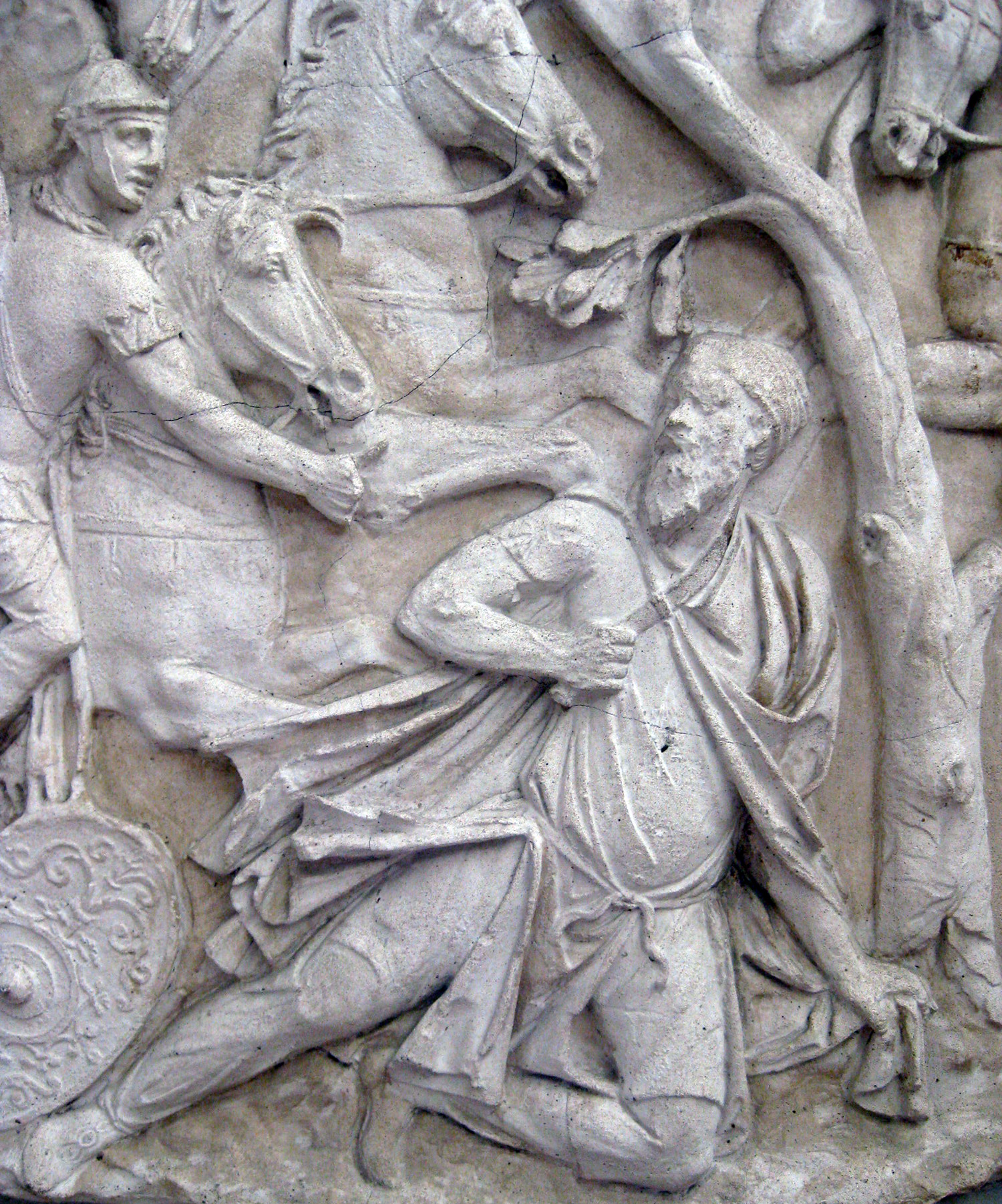
Suicide of Decebalus, from Trajan's Column

The distinctive shape was designed to get around the sides of an opponent's shield, and stab or slash them in the back. Since the thraex gladiator's usual opponent was the scutum (large shield) carrying murmillo gladiator, such a weapon as the sica was necessary to make the duel more even and exciting.

The daggers’ decoration, remarkably complex, offers them a sum of spiritual, artistically and symbolical valences. On the blade geometrical shapes were incised, but also eagles and snakes, in which case their schematization requires the existence of a certain "code", or they were an emblem that underlined the membership of a certain brotherhood at arms or a certain social status, as well possible to have a mystical/magical component included.

From all the curved weapons used in the Thracian area, the sica daggers are the only ones that make the connection between the Southern Thracians and the Thracians North to the Danube, being spread the same on both sides of the river.

The sica was the characteristic weapon of the Jewish rebel group known as the Sicarii, who were active in Judaea during the first century CE and during the First Jewish Revolt. The group derived its name from this dagger. Only three sica blades have been identified in the entire region of Palestine: at Qumran, Nahal David Cave 2 (both in the Judaean Desert), and possibly Khirbet el-Maqatir (in the northern Judaean Hills, though this example remains tentatively identified as such).

== See also ==
- Dacian warfare
- Falx
- Gladiator
- Gladius
- Illyrian warfare
- Ludus Dacicus
- Pugio
- Sicarii – Group of Jewish assassins during the Jewish–Roman wars
- Spatha
- Thracian warfare
