= Sibyna =

Type of ancient spear

A sibyna (Ancient Greek: Σιβύνη and Συβίνη and Συβήνη and Σιβύνιον and Ζιβύνη) was a type of spear used for hunting or warfare (see boar spears) in ancient times.

A long heavy spear the Illyrians used was described by the poet Ennius according to Festius. Hesychius of Alexandria, (5th century) calls it similar to a spear. Suda lexicon (10th century) calls it a Roman javelin.

== See also ==
- Illyrian weaponry
