= Sicarii =

Group of Jewish assassins during the Jewish–Roman wars

The Sicarii (Note: Hebrew: סִיקָרִיִים. Koine Greek: σικάριοι sikarioi, men of the sica.) were a group of Jewish assassins who were active throughout Judaea in the years leading up to and during the First Jewish–Roman War, which took place at the end of the Second Temple period. Often associated with the Zealots (although this relationship is uncertain), they conducted a high-profile campaign of targeted assassinations of Romans and of Jews who collaborated with them. They later became notorious for a reported mass suicide during the Siege of Masada. The group's signature weapon and namesake was a type of large dagger known as a sica, which they concealed in their cloaks before attacking their targets at public gatherings, thereafter blending in with the crowds to escape undetected.

Other than the Roman-era Jewish historian Josephus, there are no sources for the history and activities of the Sicarii. According to Josephus's account, the Sicarii's victims may have included Jonathan the High Priest, who was assassinated inside of the Second Temple shortly after being designated as the High Priest of Israel; and more than 700 Jewish women and children at Ein Gedi on the Dead Sea.

The Sicarii are one of the earliest known organized "cloak and dagger" assassination forces, predating the Order of Assassins and the ninjas (among other examples) by many centuries. Because there is only a single source on the group, their true allegiances and motives remain the subject of discussion among historians. The group is not believed to have engaged in open conflict beyond Masada and possibly the Zealot Temple siege, when they executed any Jews who advocated surrender to the Roman army.

In modern Israel, the legacy of the Sicarii inspired the Jewish terrorist group Sicarii of 1989–1990, who claimed responsibility for a number of attacks against Palestinians and against Israelis who expressed support for the Israeli–Palestinian peace process.

== Etymology ==
Josephus, writing in Koine Greek, used the term σικάριοι (sikarioi). In Latin, Sicarii is the plural form of Sicarius "dagger-man", "sickle-man". Sica, possibly from Proto-Albanian *tsikā (whence Albanian thika, "knife"), from Proto-Indo-European *ḱey- ("to sharpen") possibly via Illyrian. In later Latin usage, "sicarius" was also the standard term for a murderer (see, e.g., the Lex Cornelia de Sicariis et Veneficiis), and to this day "sicario" is a salaried assassin in Spanish and a commissioned murderer in Italian and Portuguese.

The term Σικαρίων (Sikariōn) is used in Acts 21:38 of the New Testament as an accusation against Paul the Apostle, when a tribune asks if he is the Egyptian who led "4,000 men of the sicarii into the desert". It is translated as "terrorists" in the New International Version, "murderers" in the King James Bible and "assassins" in the American Standard Version. According to historian Steve Mason, this reference is problematic because it lacks a clear connection to anti-Roman sentiments and is "best explained as a mangled recollection of Josephus."

The derived Spanish term sicario is used in contemporary Latin America to describe a contract killer.

== History ==
The Sicarii are known to history from only one source – Josephus. In a 2009 study The Sicarii in Josephus's Judean War, Professor Mark Brighton of Concordia University Irvine wrote that Josephus referred to the Sicarii directly fifteen times in eight separate contexts of The Jewish War:

- The Sicarii rise during the time of Felix (2.254)
- Joining the rebels (2.425)
- Raiding Engaddi (4.400)
- Mentioned in a passage about the Idumeans (4.516)
- The summary condemnation of Jewish rebels (7.253, 254, 262)
- Masada narrative (7.275, 297, 311)
- Activity in Egypt (7.410, 412, 415)
- In the cities around Cyrene/Catullus narrative (7.437, 444)

Brighton also noted five passages where the Sicarii are not mentioned directly but their activity is implied from the wider context:

- Rise and activity of Judas in 6 CE (2.117–18)
- Capturing of Masada (2.408)
- Rise and fall of Menahem (2.433–48)
- Joint activity with Simon ben Gioras—Part 1 (2.652–54)
- Joint activity with Simon ben Gioras—Part 2 (4.503–8)

Victims of the Sicarii are said by Josephus to have included the High Priest Jonathan, and 700 Jewish women and children at Ein Gedi. Some murders were met with severe retaliation by the Romans on the broader Jewish population of the region. On some occasions, the Sicarii would release their intended victim if their terms were met. Much of what is known about the Sicarii comes from the Antiquities of the Jews and The Jewish War by Josephus, who wrote that the Sicarii agreed to release the kidnapped secretary of Eleazar, governor of the Temple precincts, in exchange for the release of ten captured assassins.

At the beginning of the First Roman-Jewish War, the Sicarii, and (possibly) Zealot helpers (Josephus differentiated between the two but did not explain the main differences in depth), gained access to Jerusalem and committed a series of actions in an attempt to incite the population into war against Rome. In one account, given in the Talmud, they destroyed the city's food supply, using starvation to force the people to fight against the Roman siege, instead of negotiating peace. Their leaders, including Menahem ben Yehuda and Eleazar ben Ya'ir, were notable figures in the war, and the group fought in many battles against the Romans as soldiers. Together with a small group of followers, Menahem made his way to the fortress of Masada, took over a Roman garrison and slaughtered all 700 soldiers there. They also took over another fortress called Antonia and overpowered the troops of Agrippa II. He also trained them to conduct various guerrilla operations on Roman convoys and legions stationed around Judea.

Josephus also wrote that the Sicarii raided nearby Hebrew villages including Ein Gedi, where they massacred 700 Jewish women and children.

The Zealots, Sicarii and other prominent rebels finally joined forces to attack and temporarily take Jerusalem from Rome in 66 AD, where they took control of the Temple in Jerusalem, executing anyone who tried to oppose their power. The local populace resisted their control and launched a series of sieges and raids to remove the rebel factions. The rebels eventually silenced the uprising and Jerusalem stayed in their hands for the duration of the war. The Romans returned to take back the city, counter-attacking and laying siege to starve the rebels inside. The rebels held out for some time, but the constant bickering and lack of leadership caused the groups to disintegrate. The leader of the Sicarii, Menahem, was killed by rival factions during an altercation. Finally, the Romans regained control and destroyed the whole city in 70 AD.

Eleazar and his followers returned to Masada and continued their rebellion against the Romans until 73 AD. The Romans eventually took the fortress and, according to Josephus, found that most of its defenders had died by suicide rather than surrender. In Josephus' The Jewish War (vii), after the fall of the Temple in AD 70, the sicarii became the dominant revolutionary Hebrew faction, scattered abroad. Josephus particularly associates them with the mass suicide at Masada in AD 73 and to the subsequent refusal "to submit to the taxation census when Cyrenius was sent to Judea to make one," as part of their rebellion's religious and political goals.

Judas Iscariot, one of the Twelve Apostles of Jesus according to the New Testament, was believed by some to be a sicarius. Modern historians typically reject this contention, mainly because Josephus in The War of the Jews (2:254–7) mentions the appearance of the Sicarii as a new phenomenon during the procuratorships of Felix (52–60 AD), having no apparent relation with the group called Sicarii by Romans at times of Quirinius. The 2nd century compendium of Jewish oral law, the Mishnah (Makhshirin 1:6), mentions the word sikrin (Hebrew: סיקרין), perhaps related to Sicarii, and which is explained by the early rabbinic commentators as being related to the Greek: ληστής (= robbers), and to government personnel involved with implementing the laws of Sicaricon. Maimonides, in his Mishnah commentary (Makhshirin 1:6), explains the same word sikrin as meaning "people who harass and who are disposed to being violent."

== Legacy ==
The Sicarii were the basis of the Masada myth in early Zionism. They also served as the namesake of several modern Jewish militant groups, both Zionist and anti-Zionist—most notably the Sicarii of 1989 and the Sikrikim.

== In popular culture ==
In The Chosen, the first multi-season series about the life of Jesus of Nazareth, Simon the Zealot is called a "Zealot Sicarii" in episode 7 of Season 2 ("Reckoning").

== See also ==
- Jewish military history § Jewish–Roman wars
- List of Jewish civil wars
