= Bellum Dardanicum =

Bellum Dardanicum (Dardanian War)
- Part of the Roman–Dardanian wars
Date	75–73 BC
Location	Dardania (Kosovo, northern North Macedonia, southern Serbia)
Result	Roman victory • Dardani forced into submission and tribute • Resistance continued until final conquest under Augustus
Territorial changes	Roman tactical control established over parts of Dardania; full incorporation into the province of Moesia in 29–28 BC

Belligerents
Roman Republic	Dardani

Commanders and leaders
Gaius Scribonius Curio (75–73 BC); Marcus Terentius Varro Lucullus (72–71 BC)	Unknown

Strength
Several legions with auxiliaries (est. 20,000–30,000)	Unknown (tribal levy, likely 20,000+)

Casualties and losses
Light	Heavy

The Bellum Dardanicum (Latin for "Dardanian War"; 75–73 BC) was a Roman military campaign against the Dardani, a Thracian-Illyrian tribe inhabiting the region of Dardania (modern Kosovo, northern North Macedonia, and southern Serbia). The war formed part of Rome’s efforts to secure the northern frontier of the province of Macedonia.

== Background ==
After the dissolution of the Macedonian kingdom in 168 BC, the Dardani repeatedly raided the Roman province of Macedonia. These incursions intensified during the Third Mithridatic War (73–63 BC), when Roman forces were preoccupied in Asia Minor. Together with the Scordisci and other neighbouring tribes, the Dardani exploited the power vacuum to launch major raids southward.

== The war ==
In 75 BC, the proconsul of Macedonia, Gaius Scribonius Curio, launched a punitive expedition into Dardanian territory. Ancient sources claim he became the first Roman commander to reach the Danube.

The campaign continued under Curio until 73 BC and was resumed in 72–71 BC by his successor, Marcus Terentius Varro Lucullus (brother of Lucullus fighting Mithridates). Marcus Lucullus inflicted a decisive defeat on the Dardani and also campaigned against the Bessi in Thrace, celebrating a triumph in 71 BC.

== Aftermath ==
Rome achieved a tactical victory and imposed tribute and submission on the Dardani, but did not annex the region. Dardanian raids resumed periodically. Full conquest was only achieved in 29–28 BC by Marcus Licinius Crassus during Augustus’s Illyrian wars, after which Dardania was incorporated into the new province of Moesia.

== Bibliography ==
- Broughton, T. R. S. (1952). The Magistrates of the Roman Republic, Volume II (99 B.C.–31 B.C.). New York: American Philological Association.
- Mócsy, András (1974). Pannonia and Upper Moesia: A History of the Middle Danube Provinces of the Roman Empire. London: Routledge & Kegan Paul.
- Mócsy, András (1964). "Der vertuschte Dakerkrieg des M. Terentius Varro Lucullus". Acta Antiqua Academiae Scientiarum Hungaricae. 12: 93–102.
- Papazoglou, Fanula (1978). The Central Balkan Tribes in Pre-Roman Times: Triballi, Autariatae, Dardanians, Scordisci and Moesians. Amsterdam: Adolf M. Hakkert. ISBN 978-90-256-0793-7.
- Wilkes, John J. (1992). The Illyrians. Oxford: Blackwell. ISBN 0-631-19807-5.

=== Ancient sources ===
- Florus, Epitome of Roman History, 1.39
- Eutropius, Breviarium, 6.2
- Livy, Periochae, books 95–97
- Sallust, Histories, fragments
