= Greek helmet =

Greek helmet may refer to any of the following:

- Attic helmet
- Boar's tusk helmet
- Boeotian helmet
- Chalcidian helmet
- Corinthian helmet
- Galea (helmet)
- Illyrian type helmet
- Kegelhelm
- Phrygian type helmet
- Pileus (hat)
