= Thracian warfare =

Ancient Greek warfare

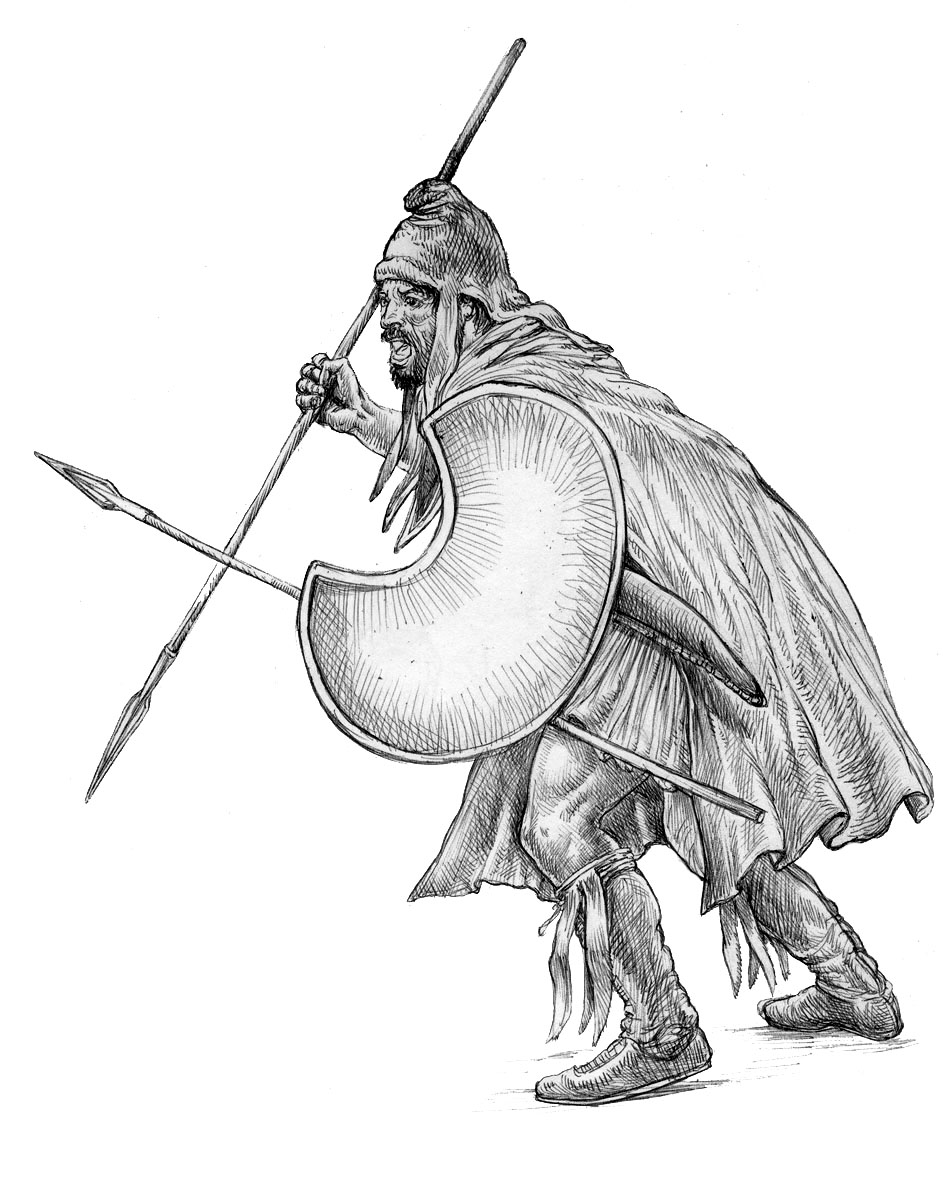
Thracian peltast, 5th to 4th century BC.

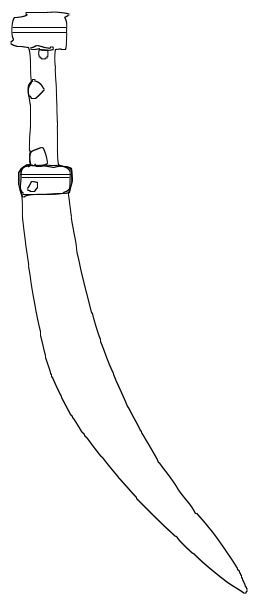
The Sica, the national weapon of the Thracians

The history of Thracian warfare spans from the 10th century BC up to the 1st century AD in the region defined by Ancient Greek and Latin historians as Thrace. It concerns the armed conflicts of the Thracian tribes and their kingdoms in the Balkans. Apart from conflicts between Thracians and neighboring nations and tribes, numerous wars were recorded among Thracian tribes.

== Mythological ==
Instances of Thracian people engaging in armed conflict occur in the Iliad of Homer and in Greek mythology. The Greek Temenids ousted the Thracians from Pieria (later central Macedonia). The Thracians, prominent warriors who became allies of Troy, came from the Aegean coast. In the Odyssey, there is only one instance of Thracians, that of Cicones again on the coast, but they are weak.

The Thracians were a particularly fierce culture in terms of violence and conflict and so they appeared in Greek Mythology as mostly associated with its stories of strife. The god of war Ares was said to have been born in Thrace and was also heavily worshiped there; in contrast to the revulsion of his worship by many other Balkan city states. Homer recounts in the book of Odyssey that an embarrassed Ares retreated among his Thracian followers when his love affair with the goddess Aphrodite was caught and the two were promptly ensnared by Hephaestus.

== Tribal wars ==
Thracian tribes fought amongst each other and they allied themselves with the Greeks against other Thracian tribes. Those allied with the Greeks were more civilized and they were usually established in settlements along the Thracian coast. The interior tribes were known as savages, retaining their barbarous habits even until the Roman period. The tribal wars also kept Thrace from becoming a major regional power due to the lack of a central government.

At the onset of the Peloponnesian War, the Thracian tribes were united under the rule of Sitalces, king of the Odrysae. It was allied with Athens during the conflict. However, the kingdom was again split into different parts after the death of king Seuthes. It was during this time when Philip of Macedon conquered a large swath of Thrace, absorbing the territory and its tribes into Macedon.

== Kingdoms ==
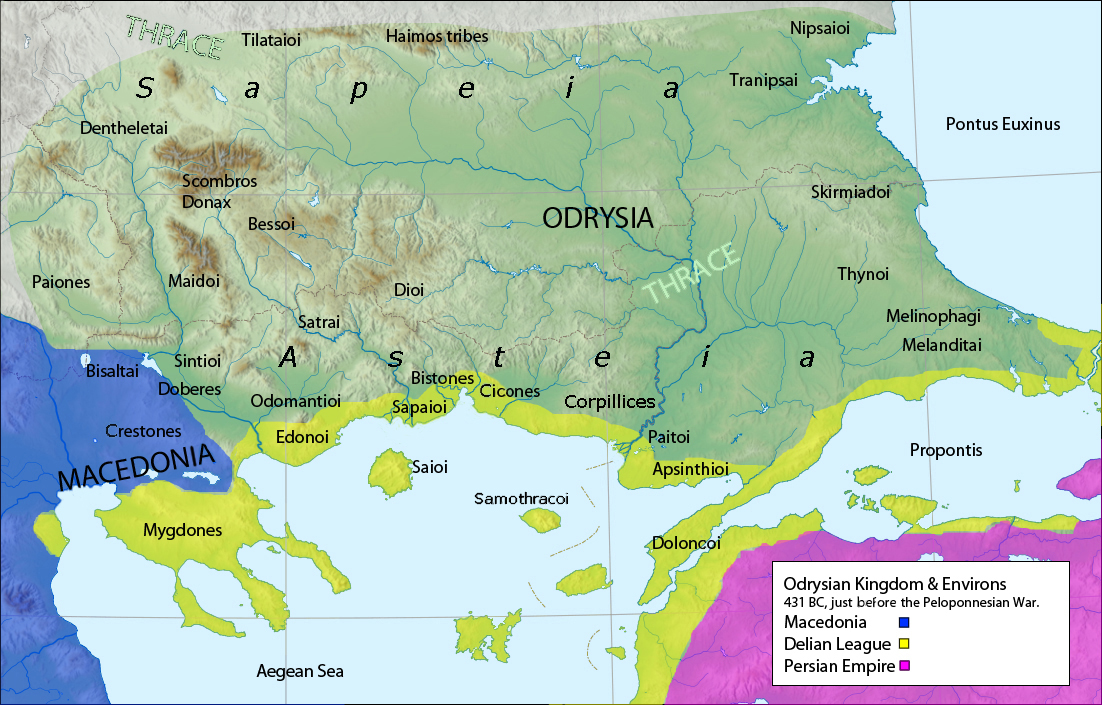
Map of the Odrysian kingdom

The Odrysian kingdom (Ancient Greek, "Βασιλεία Όδρυσων") was a union of Thracian tribes that endured between the 5th century BC and the 3rd century BC. The Odrysian state was the first Thracian kingdom that acquired power in the region, by the unification of many Thracian tribes under a single ruler, King Teres 5th century BC. It became involved in wars and military conflicts against the Romans, Greek colonies, the kingdom of Macedon and the Diadochi, the Persian Empire, Paeonians, Dacians, Celts, Scythians and Thracian tribes. Sometimes it was allied with various Ancient Greek tribes or Greek city states. During the Peloponnesian War, Thracians were the allies of Athens. The Thracians fought alongside Athenians and Macedonians against the forces of the Spartans. Greek generals like Iphicrates and Charidemos fought for the Odrysae as well. The Thracians served under Scythian kings in 310 BC. Odrysian military strength was based on intra-tribal elite making the kingdom prone to fragmentation. Although the kingdom was wealthy, a large proportion of its income was in kind and suitable portions had to be paid to the tribal chiefs. The army was mostly fed and paid by plunder. Sitalces was able to raise an army supposedly 150,000 strong for his invasion of Macedonia in 429 BC but these economic and political factors (plus the onset of winter) meant that this army only held together for about six weeks and any Thracian conquests were ephemeral.

The Sapaeans ruled Thrace after the Odrysians until its incorporation to the Roman Empire as a province. Thrace became a Client state of Rome at 11 BC and was annexed at 46 AD.

== Thracian troop types and organization ==
=== Infantry and Cavalry ===
Thrace had the potential to muster a huge number of troops though this rarely occurred. By tradition, Thracians honored warriors and, according to Herodotus, despised all other occupations. The Thracians fought as peltasts using javelins and crescent or round wicker shields called peltes. Missile weapons were favored but close combat weaponry was carried by the Thracians as well. These close combat weapons varied from the dreaded rhomphaia to clubs (used to knock the heads off the spears in Xenophon's Anabasis by Thynians), one- and two-sided axes, bows, knives, spears, akinakes and long swords. Thracians shunned armor and greaves and fought as light as possible, favoring mobility above all other traits and had excellent horsemen. The sica was considered their national weapon. The Bithynian Thracians had contributed a number of 6,000 men (60,000 according to Herodotus) in Xerxes I of Persia campaign of 480 BC but in general resisted Persian occupation and turned against Mardonius's army as he retreated. The Triballi frequently used Scythian and Celtic equipment. Thracians decorated their bodies with tattoos like the Illyrians and the Dacians.

Thucidides writes of their infantry tactics when attacked by Theban cavalry:

"dashing out and closing their ranks according to the tactics of their country"

Arrian writes of a tactic using wagons.

==== Archaic ====
A Thracian javelinman would wield a crescent wicker shield and a couple of javelins. This troop type was to persist into the classic and Hellenistic era. Organized groups of spearmen or javelin throwers were not used.

==== Classical ====
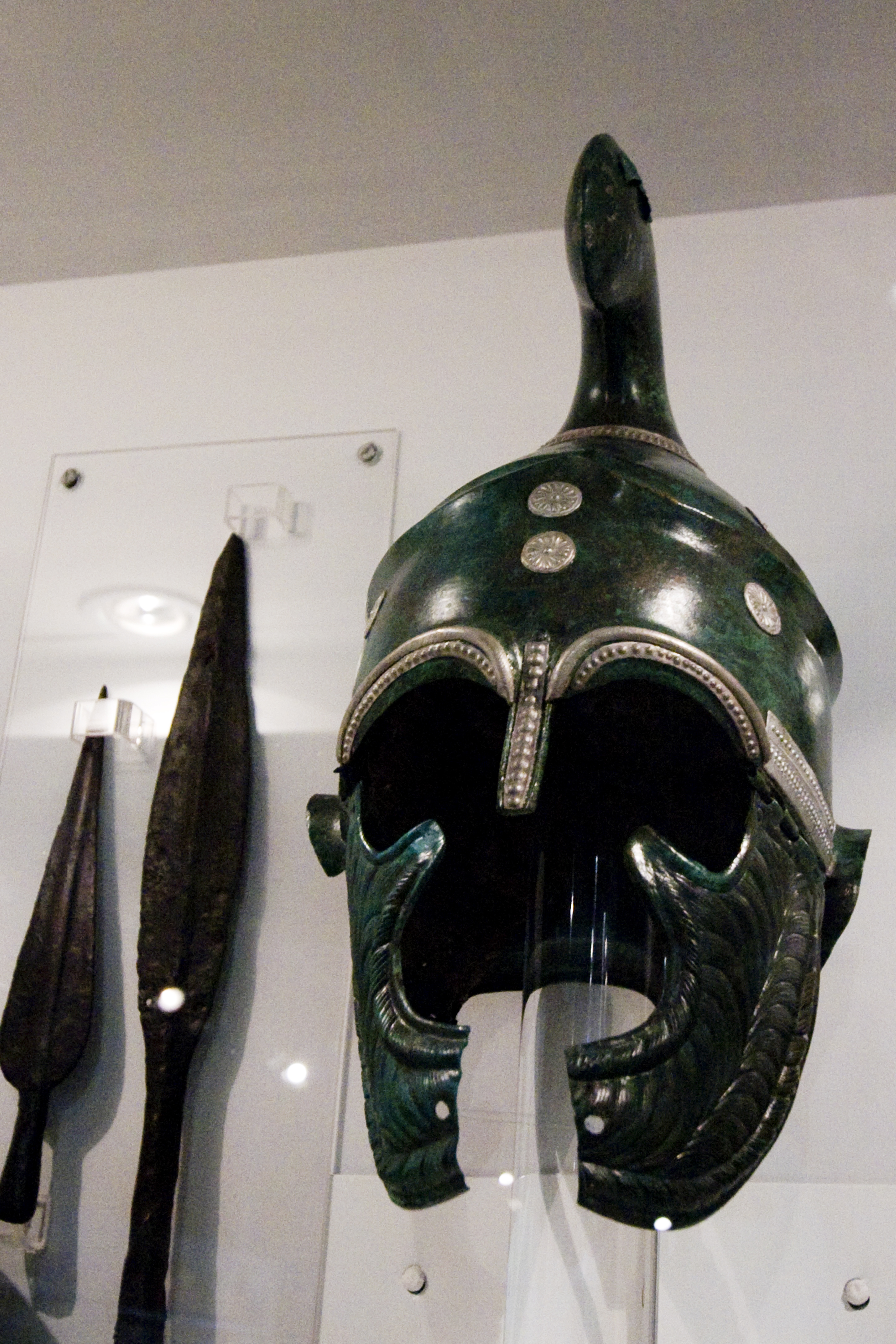
Phrygian or Thracian type helmet. Unusual having a nasal in place of the usual peak.

In the 4th century BC, both infantry and cavalry troops started wearing helmets (some of leather) and some peltasts are seen with greaves.

Principal weapons in the 4th century BC (as well as earlier) were the spear and short knife.

Armor, when it was available (for the nobility), was at first leather or bronze but iron armour started appearing in the 4th century BC.

Thracian cavalry would wear leather armor or no armor and would be armed with javelins, a bow, or a spear. Only royal cavalry would wear armor. Oval shields and peltes (even by heavy cavalry) were later used. Thracian cavalry was numerous. It was also legendary for its combat power so that Philip of Macedon adopted its wedge-shaped formation for the Macedonian cavalry maneuvers.

The helmet type used mostly was the Chalcidian type helmet (over 60 have been found) and, to a much lesser extent, the Corinthian type helmet (one has been found), Phrygian type helmet, Attic type helmet and Scythian type helmet (an open face helmet) with many hybrid types occurring. No Illyrian type helmet has been found in the east Balkans.

==== Hellenistic ====
A Thracian footman (3rd century BC - 1st century BC) could wield a knife or sword, Rhomphaia, a helmet, two javelins and a light oval wooden shield (or a heavier iron-rimmed and spined thureos). No Thracian infantry wore greaves until the 4th century BC. Later native and Greek types started being used, the Greek type being rarer. Thracians used mixed Thracian and Greek equipment and armors from different time periods, to the point of wearing armors that ceased to be used elsewhere; this is something they did even in the classic era. Later they adopted Roman armaments.

=== Thracian mercenaries ===
Thracians were highly sought as mercenaries due to their ferocity in battle, but they were infamous for their love of plunder. Thracian mercenaries played an important role in the affairs between Athenians and Spartans. The Odomantii were described as expensive mercenaries. In one instance in 413 BC, Dii mercenaries were so expensive to pay that after they missed the boat to Sicily the Athenians sent them home. They were hired occasionally by Persians. Croesus had hired many Thracian swordsmen for the Lydian army. They also served in the Republican Roman and Mithridatic armies, as well as the armies of the Diadocii. They provided up to one third of the cavalry in Macedonian armies and up to a fifth of their infantry (usually as levies or allies rather than mercenaries). They later formed one of the most important nationalities in the Roman army, contributing up to 20,000 troops at any one time to auxiliary units during the early empire.

=== Nobility ===
A Thracian chieftain could have access to armor and helmets. One could be equipped with a Chalcidian type helmet, a breastplate (this sort of armor is rarely found outside Crete and only one has been found in Thrace, a bell-type cuirass) with a mitrai (a plate attached to the bottom of the cuirass to protect the abdomen), a wicker pelte, two javelins and a sword. Body armor was restricted to nobles and army commanders. Greek armor was in use in Thrace before the classical age. Nobles would sometimes wear pectorals on their chests as a sign of rank.

=== Navy ===
There was no Thracian navy but there were instances of Thracians turning to piracy. The Greek cities of the coast that paid tribute to the Thracian kings did sometimes provide the Thracian kings with ships.

== Fortifications ==
Even though Thracians attempted to build only one polis, they had forts in hills built as places of refuge. Thracian villages had basic fortifications as Xenophon witnesses in Anabasis. Tacitus in his Annals describes a Roman attack against a hill fort. There were many Thracian hill forts and some were inhabited. Other fortified Thracian towns existed at places like Hellis and Kabyle.

== External influences ==
=== Scythian ===
Scythians akinakes, Scythian saddles and horse archer equipment to the Scythian type helmet also called Kuban type. It was an open-face bronze helmet that stopped halfway (like a skullcap) and had leather flaps with sewn bronze plates that protected the back part of the head including the nape and the sides of the face. The Scythian cavalry wedge had been adopted by the Thracian cavalry. Despite the power of the Odrysians except during the reigns of Teres and Sitalkes they were still weaker than the Scythians militarily. Scale armor was adopted as well as a composite metal cuirass. The most northern Thracian tribe, the Getai, were so similar to the Scythians that they were often confused with them. Odrysian Thracian kings made treaties and royal marriages as equals with the Scythians. The royal name Spartokos (Spartacus) is shared between some Thracian royalty and some Crimean Skythian kings.

=== Celtic ===
Thracian warfare was affected by Celts in a variety of ways like the adoption of certain long swords though this must not have been universal among them. The Triballi had adopted Celtic equipment. Another weapon, the sica was called Thracian sword (Ancient Greek,"Θρακικον ξίφος") though it did not originate from there, despite its popular usage (it was considered their national weapon). The sword's utmost origin was the Hallstatt culture and the Thracians may have adopted or inherited it.

=== Hellenic and Hellenistic ===
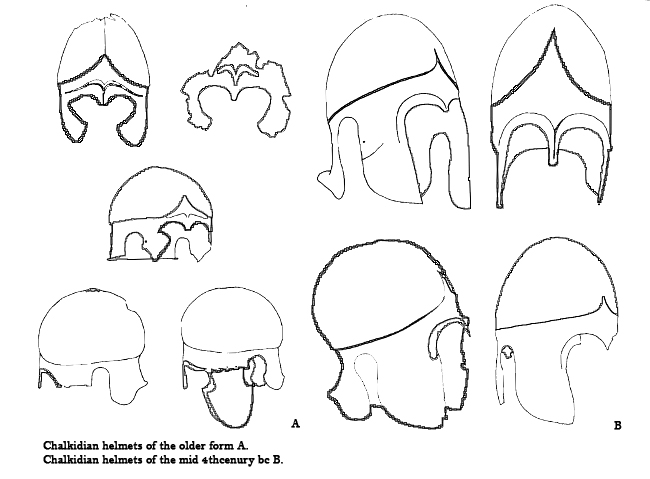
Chalcidian type helmets worn by Thracians, mid-4th century BC and older forms

Greece affected Thracian warfare early on with the xiphos and other swords, Greek type greaves, breastplates, a variety of helmets and other equipment. During the Hellenistic period more Greek armaments were adopted. Seuthes had adopted a Greek tactic for a night march (though night marches and attacks were a favourite Thracian tactic). Thracian kings were the first to be Hellenized.

=== Roman ===
Thracians of the Roman client states used Roman equipment. From 11 BC onwards Thracians would start resembling Roman legionaries. Thracians in Moesia, Dacia and the North were Romanized.

== Reputation in classical sources ==
Thracians were regarded as warlike, ferocious, and savagely bloodthirsty. Thracians were seen as "Barbarians" by other peoples, namely the Greeks and the Romans. Plato in his Republic considers them, along with the Scythians, extravagant and high-spirited; and in his Laws considers them a war-like nation, grouping them with Celts, Persians, Scythians, Iberians and Carthaginians. Polybius wrote of Cotys' sober and gentle character being unlike that of most Thracians. Tacitus in his Annals writes of them being wild, savage and impatient, disobedient even to their own kings. Polyaenus and Strabo write how the Thracians broke their pacts of truce with trickery. The Thracians struck their weapons against each other before battle and engaged in night attacks. Diegylis was considered one of the most bloodthirsty chieftains by Diodorus Siculus. An Athenian club for lawless youths was named after the Triballi. The Dii were responsible for the worst atrocities of the Peloponnesian War killing every living thing, including children and dogs, in Tanagra and Mycalessos. Thracians would impale Roman heads on their spears and Rhomphaias such as in the Kallinikos skirmish in 171 BC. Herodotus writes that "they sell their children and let their daughters commerce with whatever men they please".

== List of Thracian battles ==
This is a list of battles or conflicts that Thracians had a leading or crucial role in, usually as mercenaries.

- 6th century BC Persian Empire against Thracian tribes, Thracian Victory
- 401 BC Clearchus against Thracians, Thracian Victory
- 376 BC Chabrias against Thracians, Thracian defeat
- 331 BC Antipater against Memnon of Rhodes and Seuthes III of Thrace, Thracian and Rhodian Victory
- 323 BC Lysimachus against Seuthes III, Thracian Victory
- 279 BC Gauls against Seuthopolis, Thracian defeat
- 214 BC Thracians against Tylis, Thracian victory
- 110 BC Minucius Rufus against Bessi and Scordisci, Thracian defeat
- AD 7 Marcus Valerius Messalla Messallinus, Germanicus & Rhoemetalces against Dalmatians and Pannonians, Marcus Valeurius victory, it is not known how long Rhoemetalces participated

== See also ==
- Dacian warfare
- Illyrian warfare
- Celtic warfare
- List of ancient tribes in Thrace and Dacia
- List of rulers of Thrace and Dacia
- Rhomphaia
- Sica
