= Pileus (hat) =

Felt conical or half-egg-shaped cap, worn in Ancient Greece, Rome and by ecclesiastics

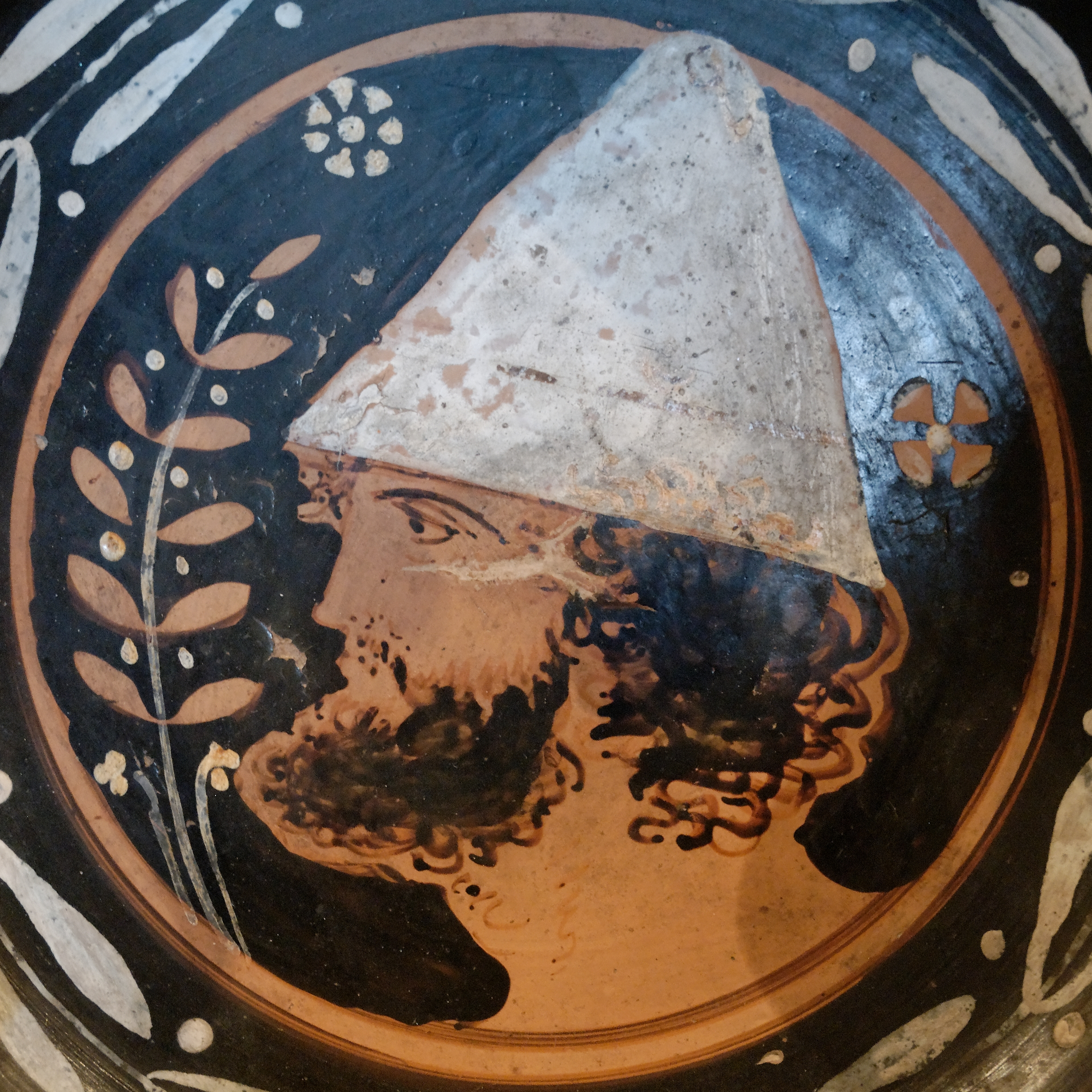
Apulian red figure depicting a conical pileus hat, third quarter of the 4th century BC, Louvre

The pileus (Ancient Greek: πῖλος, pîlos; also pilleus or pilleum in Latin) was a brimless felt cap worn in Ancient Greece, Etruria, Illyria (especially Pannonia), later also introduced in Ancient Rome. The pileus also appears on Apulian red-figure pottery.

The pilos and petasos were the most common types of hats in Archaic and Classical era (8th–4th century BC) Greece. In the 5th century BC, a bronze version began to appear in Ancient Greece and it became a popular infantry helmet. It occasionally had a horsehair crest. The Greek pilos resembled the Roman and Etruscan pileus, which were typically made of felt. The Greek πιλίδιον (pilidion) and Latin pilleolus were smaller versions, similar to a skullcap.

Similar caps were worn in later antiquity and the early medieval ages in various parts of Europe, as seen in Gallic and Frankish dress. The Albanian traditional felt cap, the qeleshe, worn today in Albania, Kosovo and adjacent areas, originated from a similar felt cap worn by the ancient Illyrians.

A pointed version called pileus cornutus served as a distinguishing sign for Jewish people in the Holy Roman Empire for five centuries (12th–17th centuries).

== Name ==
The word for the cap in antiquity was pil(l)eus or pilos, indicating a kind of felt. Greek πῖλος pilos, Latin pellis, Albanian plis, as well as Old High German filiz and Proto-Slavic *pьlstь are considered to come from a common Proto-Indo-European root meaning "felt".

== History ==
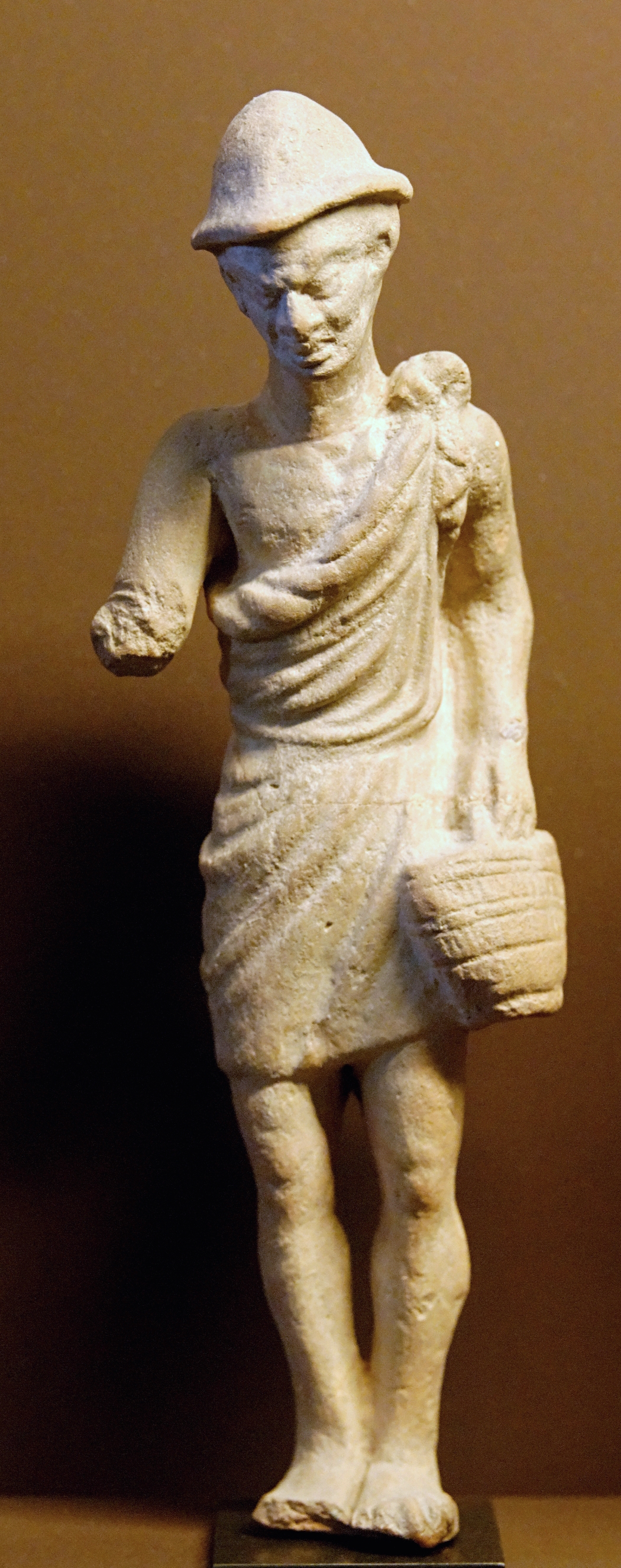
Ancient Greek terracotta statuette of a peasant wearing a pilos, 1st century BC

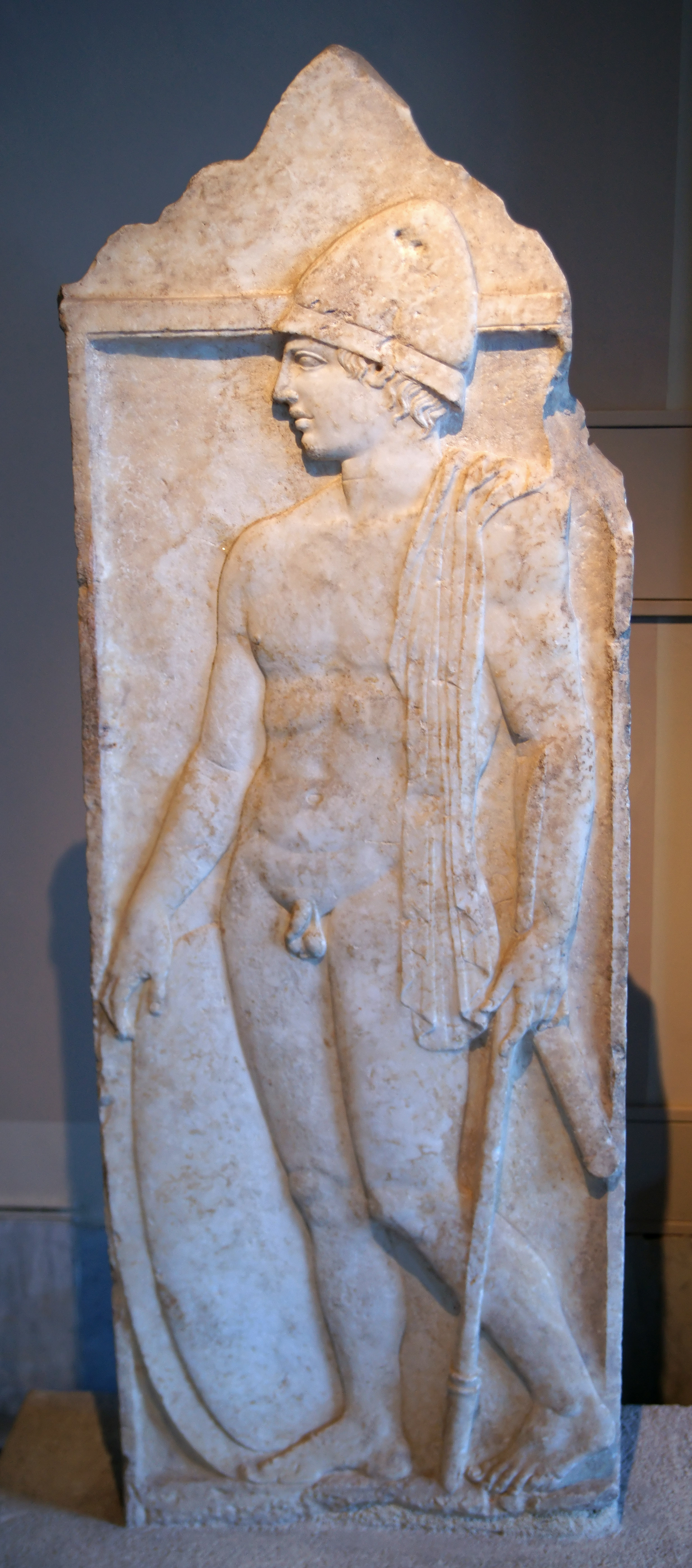
Funerary stele of an Ancient Macedonian soldier from Pella, 4th century BC

=== Ancient Greece ===
==== Pilos hat ====
The pilos (Greek: πῖλος, felt) was a typical conical hat in Ancient Greece among travelers, workmen and sailors, though sometimes a low, broad-rimmed version was also preferred, known as petasos. It could be made of felt or leather. The pilos together with the petasos were the most common types of hats in Archaic and Classical era (8th–4th century BC) Greece.

Pilos caps often identify the mythical twins, or Dioscuri, Castor and Pollux, as represented in sculptures, bas-reliefs and on ancient ceramics. Their caps were supposedly the remnants of the egg from which they hatched. The pilos appears on votive figurines of boys at the sanctuary of the Cabeiri at Thebes, the Cabeirion.

In warfare, the pilos type helmet was often worn by the peltast light infantry, in conjunction with the exomis, but it was also worn by the heavy infantry.

In various artistic depictions in the middle Byzantine period soldiers are seen wearing pilos caps.

==== Pilos helmet ====
From the 5th century BC the Greeks developed the pilos helmet which derived from the hat of the same name. This helmet was made of bronze in the same shape as the pilos which was presumably sometimes worn under the helmet for comfort, giving rise to the helmet's conical shape. Some historians theorize that the pilos helmet had widespread adoption in some Greek cities such as Sparta, however, there is no primary historical source or any archeological evidence that would suggest that Sparta or any other Greek state would have used the helmet in a standardized fashion for their armies. What led historians to believe that the helmet was widespread in places such as Sparta was, amongst other reasons, the supposed advancement of battlefield tactics that required that infantry have full vision and mobility. However, many other types of Greek helmet offered similar designs to the pilos when it came to visibility, such as the konos or the chalcidian helmets.

=== Etruria ===
Being of Greek origin the Pilos helmet was worn in the late Etruscan Period by the local armies in the region.

=== Illyria ===
A so-called "Illyrian cap" was also known as "Panonian pileus" in the period of the Tetrarchy. As such, during the period of the barracks emperors the influences of the Illyrian provinces of the Roman Empire were evident, such as the wide use of the Pannonian pileus.

The Albanian traditional felt cap (Albanian: plis, cognate of pilos and pileus) originated from a similar felt cap worn by the Illyrians. The 1542 Latin dictionary De re vestiaria libellus, ex Bayfio excerptus equated an Albanian hat with a kyrbasia, and described it as a "tall pileus [hat] in the shape of a cone" (pileus altus in speciem coni eductus).

An Illyrian wearing a pileus has been hesitantly identified on a Roman frieze from Tilurium in Dalmatia; the monument could be part of a trophy base erected by the Romans after the Great Illyrian Revolt (6–9 BC).

A cylindrical flat-topped felt cap made of fur or leather originated in Pannonia, and came to be known as the Pannonian cap (pileus pannonicus).

=== Rome ===
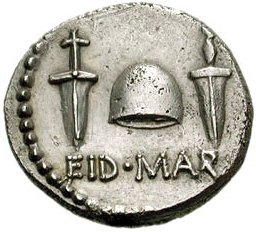
Pileus between two daggers, on the reverse of a denarius issued by Brutus to commemorate the assassination of Julius Caesar on the Ides of March

The Roman pileus resembled the Greek pilos and was often made of felt. In Ancient Rome, a slave was freed in a ceremony in which a praetor touched the slave with a rod called a vindicta and pronounced him to be free. The slave's head was shaved and a pileus was placed upon it. Both the vindicta and the cap were considered symbols of Libertas, the goddess representing liberty.

The rod and hat were part of a legal ritual of manumission. A 3rd-party adsertor libertatis (liberty asserter, neither slaver or enslaved) would state: Hunc Ego hominem ex jure Quiritum liberum esse aio (I declare this man is free) while using the "vindicta" (one of multiple manumission types). The legal ritual was explicitly designed to be anti-slavery in the interest of self-empowerment of all members of society, even those legally unable to pursue it directly e.g. the enslaved, and to guarantee that liberty was permanent.

In one 19th-century dictionary of classical antiquity it is written: "Among the Romans the cap of felt was the emblem of liberty. When a slave obtained his freedom he had his head shaved, and wore instead of his hair an undyed pileus." Hence the phrase servos ad pileum vocare is a summons to liberty, by which slaves were frequently called upon to take up arms with a promise of liberty (Liv. XXIV.32). The figure of Liberty on some of the coins of Antoninus Pius, struck 145 AD, holds this cap in the right hand.

In the period of the Tetrarchy, the Pannonian cap (pileus pannonicus) was adopted as the main military cap of the Roman army, until the 6th century AD; it was worn by lightly armed or off-duty soldiers, as well as workmen. It often appears in Roman artwork, in particular mosaics, from the late 3rd century AD. The earliest preserved specimen of the hat was found at the Roman quarry of Mons Claudianus, in the eastern desert of Egypt, and is dated to 100–120 AD; it has a dark-green color, and looks like a low fez or pillbox hat.

=== Later periods and variants ===
Similar caps were worn in later antiquity and the early medieval ages in various parts of Europe, as seen in Gallic and Frankish dress, in particular of the Merovingian and Carolingian era.

== Gallery ==
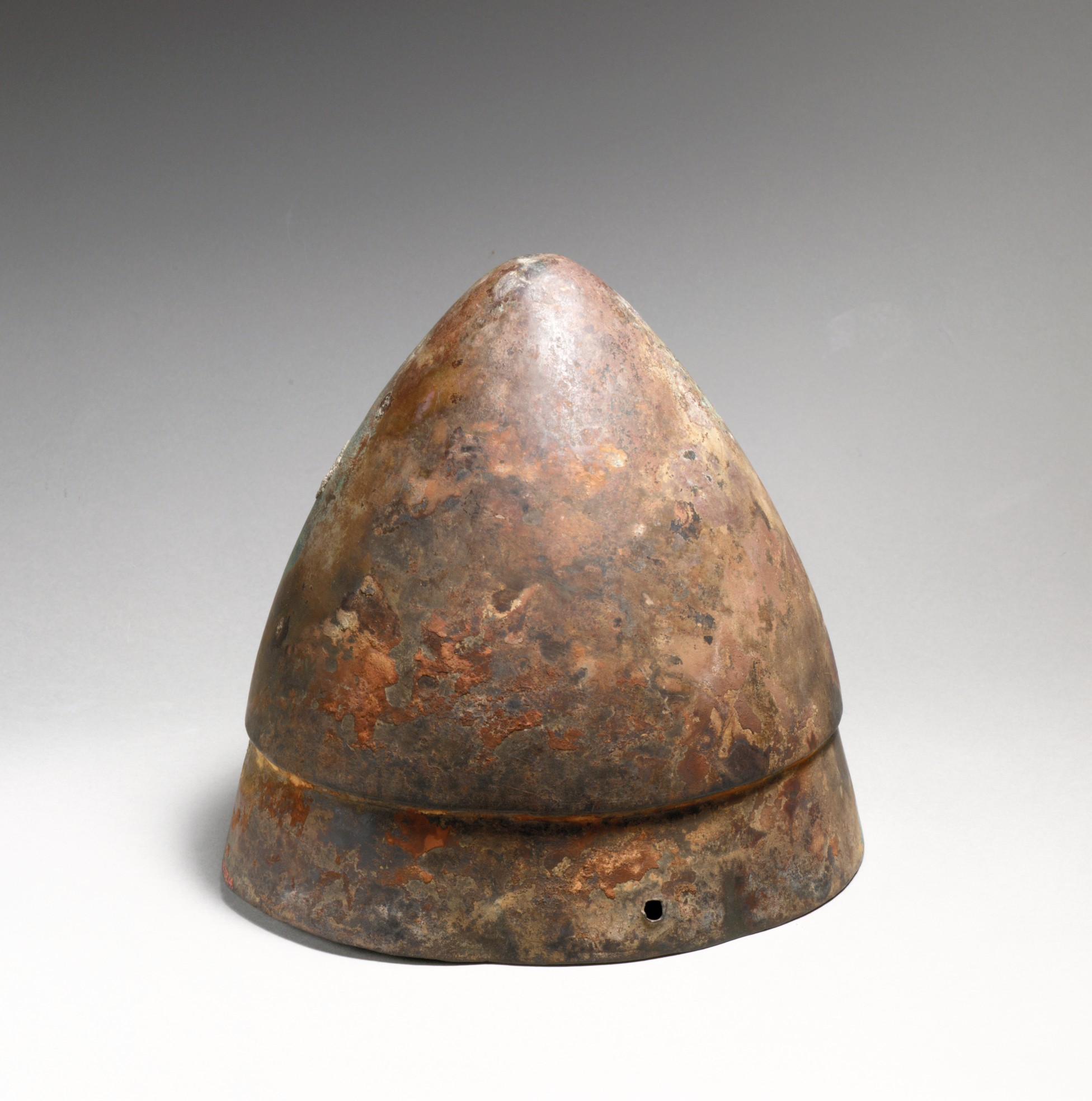
Ancient Greek pilos type helmet, 450–425 BC

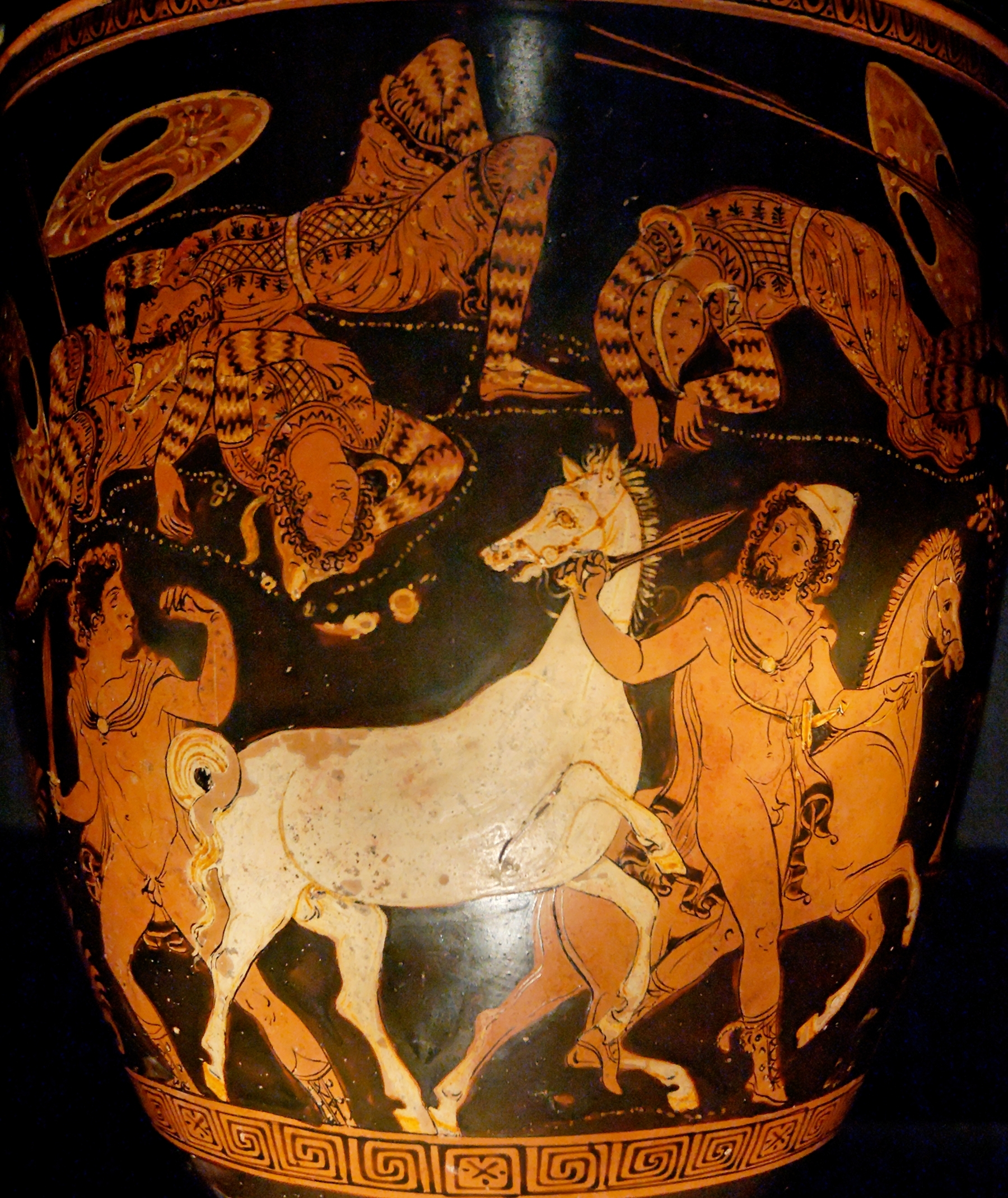
Odysseus wearing the pilos. Ancient Greek red-figure situla from Apulia, ca. 360 BC, Museo Nazionale Archaeologico, Naples

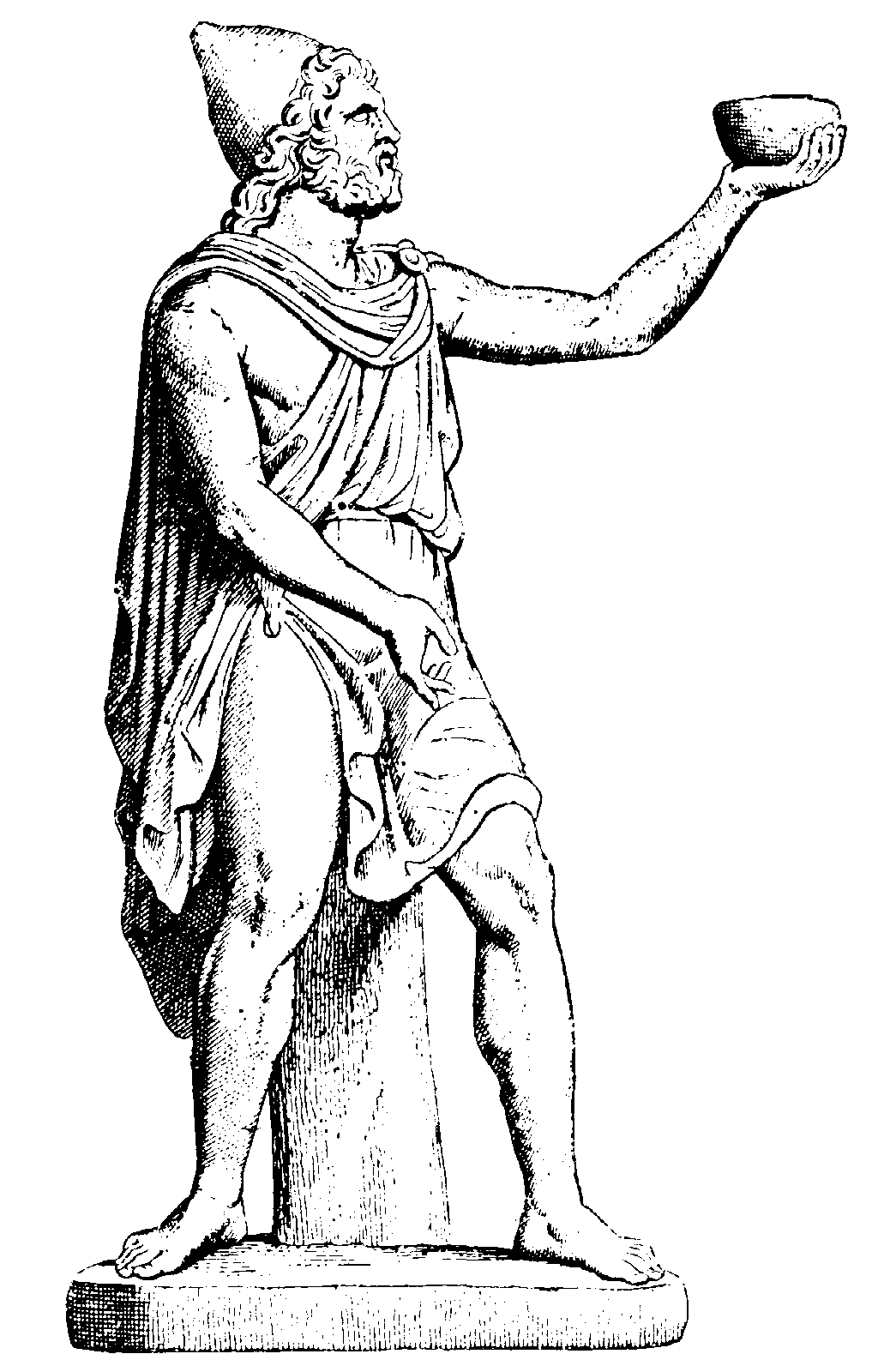
Odysseus wearing a pilos, an exomis and a chlamys

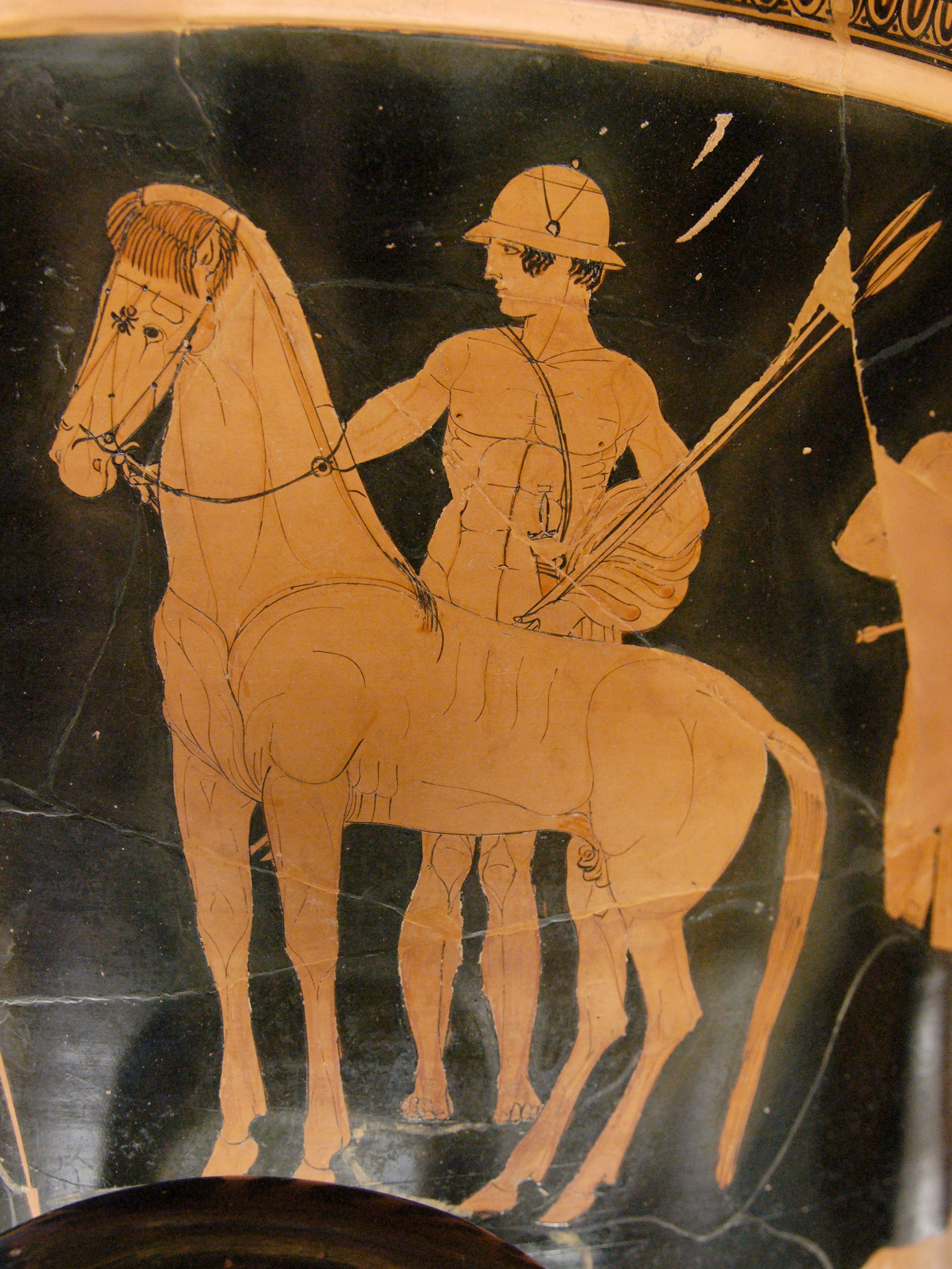
Castor wearing a pilos-like helmet, Attic red-figure calyx-krater, c. 460–450 BC

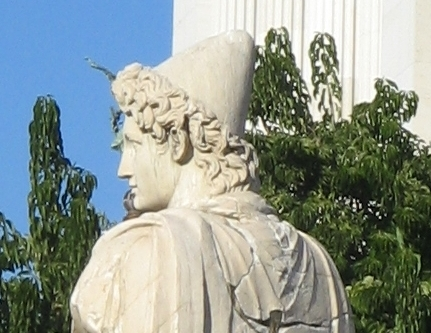
The pileus particularly identifies the Dioscuri (here on a colossal statue of late antiquity in the Campidoglio, Rome).

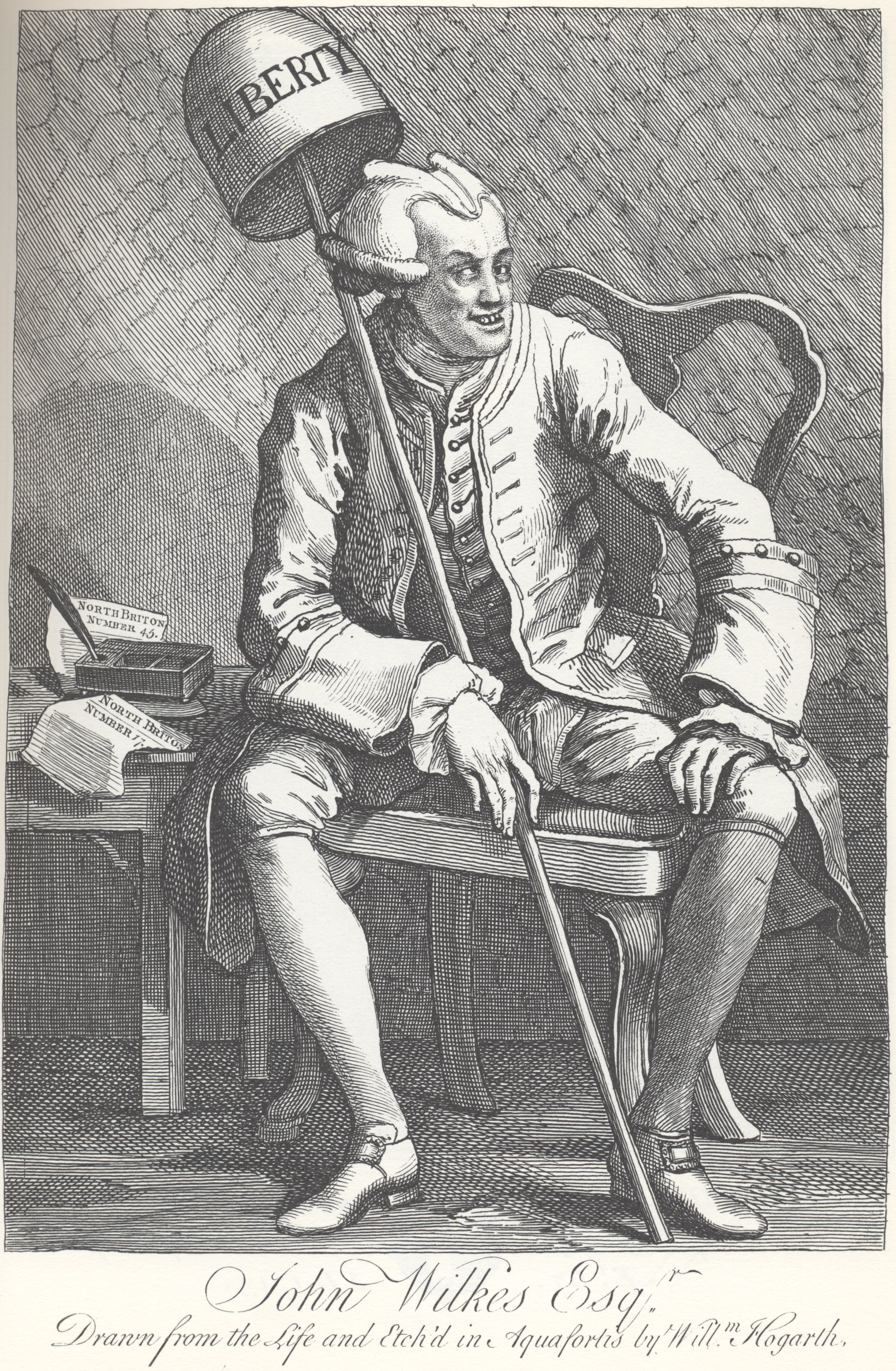
John Wilkes depicted by Hogarth with the cap of Liberty on a pole, as it was sometimes carried in public demonstrations during the 18th century

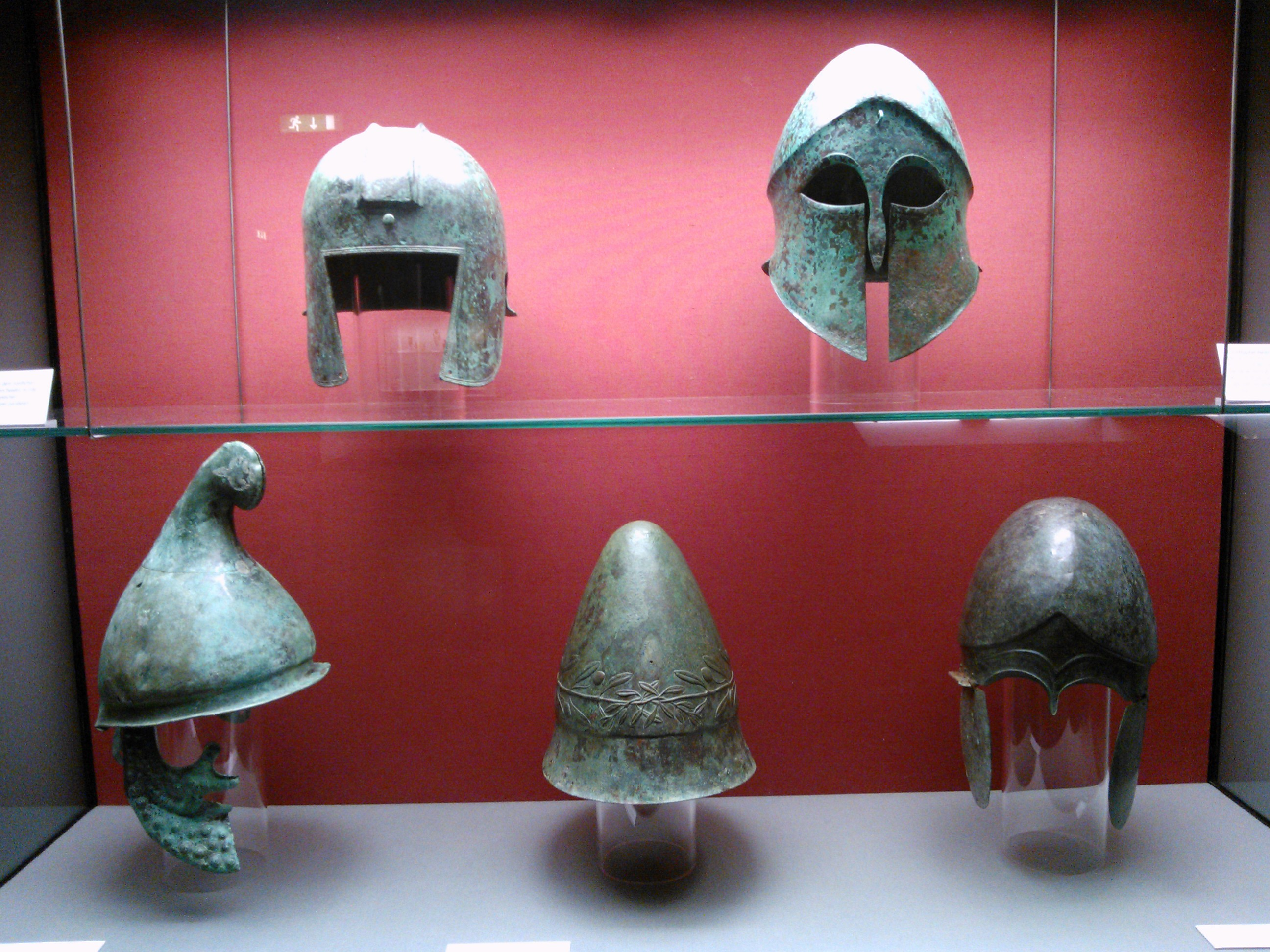
Ancient Greek helmets. Top line, from left to right: Illyrian type helmet, Corinthian helmet. Bottom line, from left to right: Phrygian type helmet, Pileus helmet with an olive branch ornament, Chalcidian helmet. Staatliche Antikensammlungen

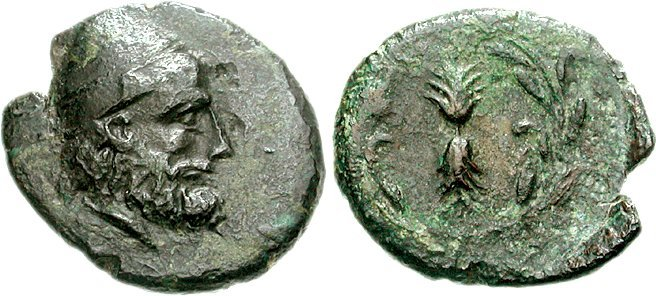
Odysseus wearing pileus depicted in a 3rd-century BC coin from Ithaca

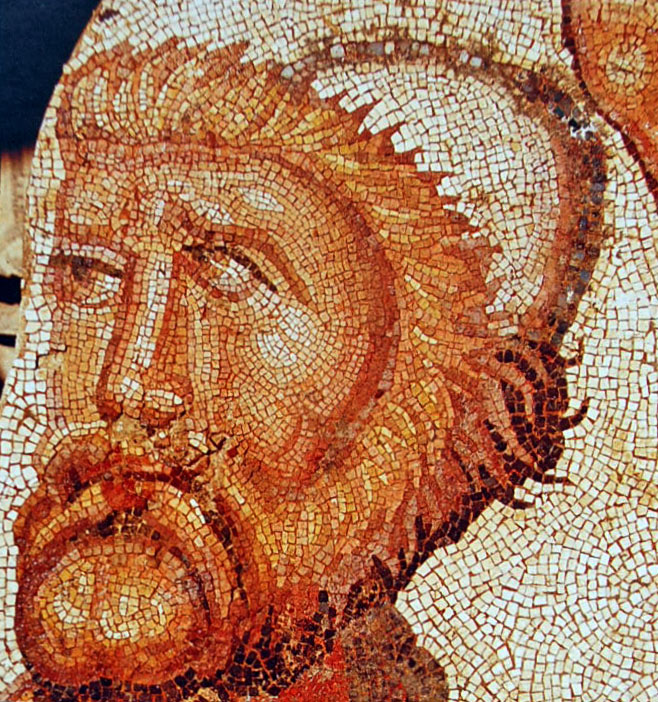
Part of a Roman mosaic depicting Odysseus at Skyros unveiling the disguised Achilles, from La Olmeda, Pedrosa de la Vega, Spain, 5th century AD

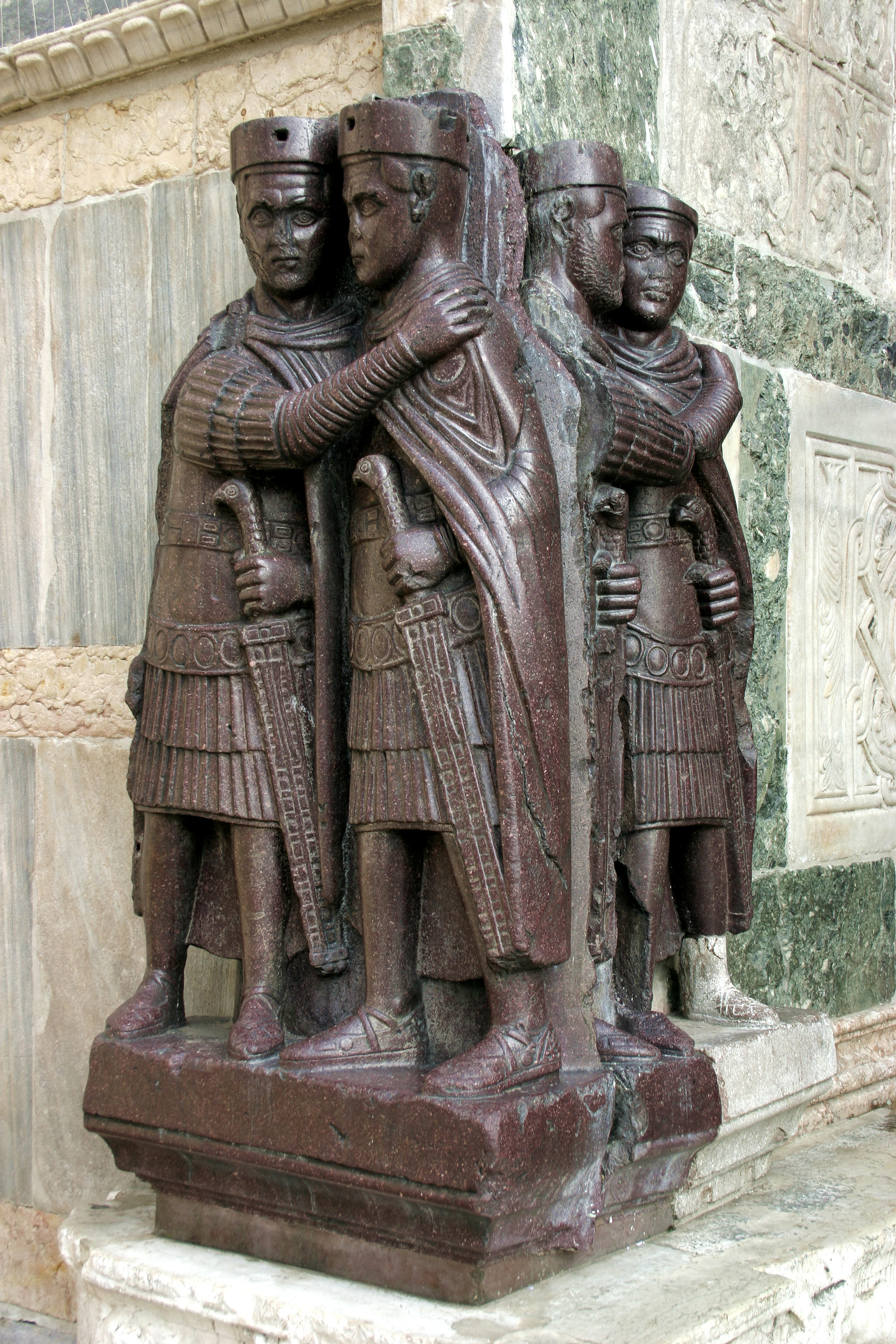
The Tetrarchs, a porphyry statue on Venice's Basilica di San Marco, shows the emperor Diocletian and his three imperial colleagues. All wear the woollen "Pannonian" pileus caps worn by officers in the late army.

== See also ==
- List of hat styles
- Phrygian cap
- Attic helmet
- Barbute
- Boar's tusk helmet
- Boeotian helmet
- Kegelhelm
- Witch hat
- Zucchetto

== Bibliography ==
- Sumner, Graham (2003). Roman Military clothing (2) AD 200 to 400. ISBN 978-1841765594.
