= Exomis =

One-shouldered belted tunic of Ancient Greece

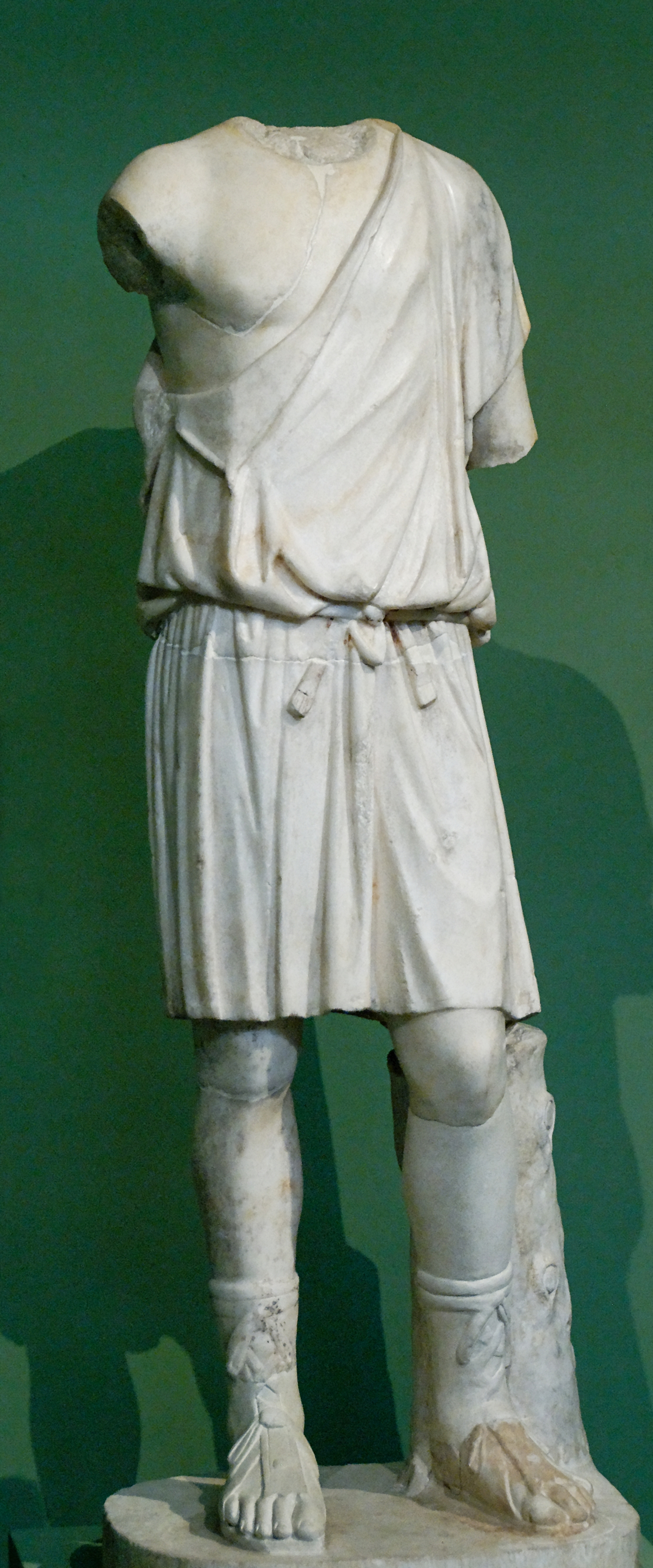
Statue with an exomis

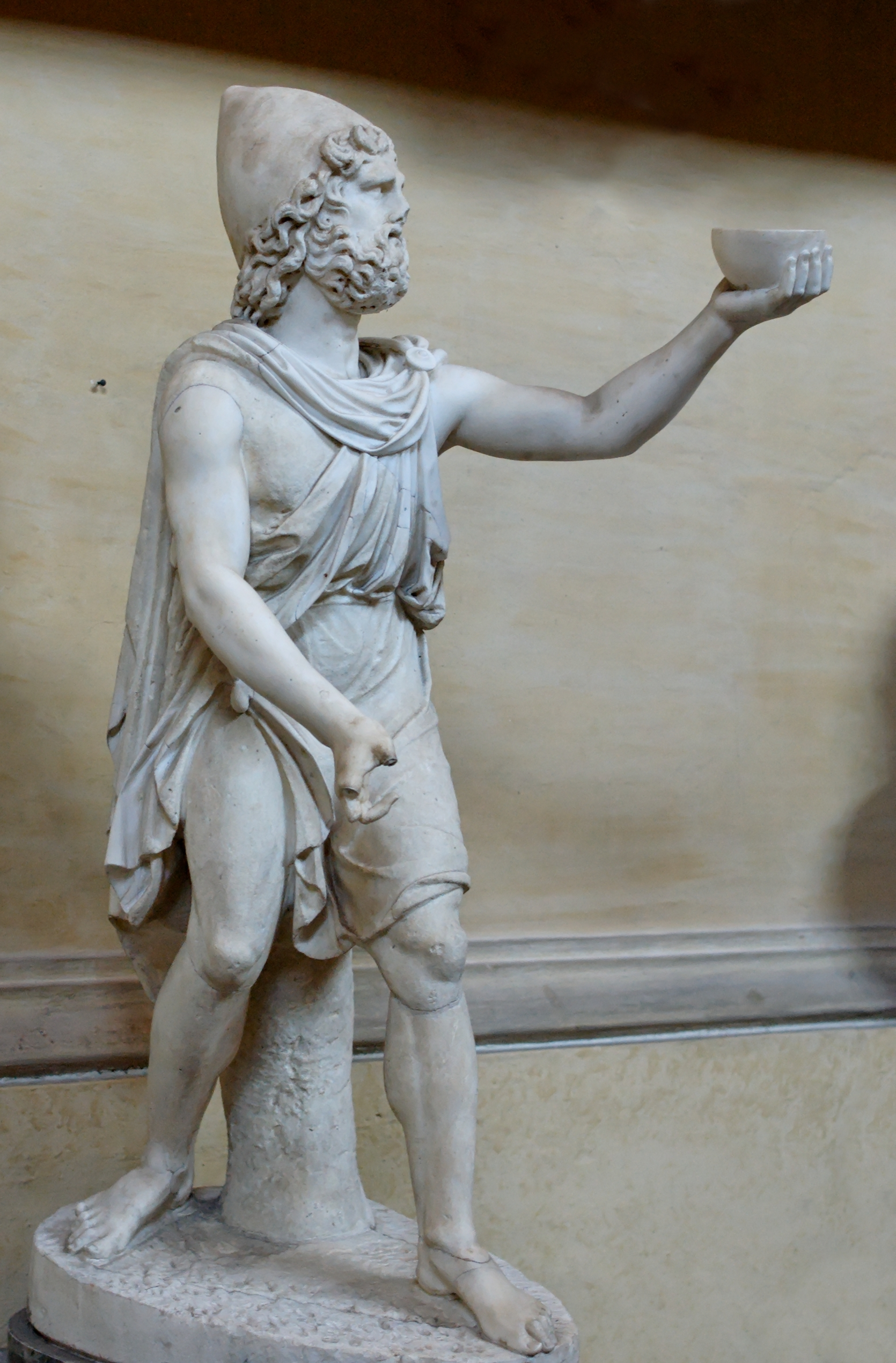
Odysseus wearing the pilos hat, an exomis and a chlamys

The exomis (Ancient Greek: ἐξωμίς, romanized: exōmís; from Ancient Greek έξω (éxō) 'outside' and ὦμος (ômos) 'shoulder') was a Greek tunic used by the workers and the light infantry. The tunic largely replaced the older chitoniskos (or short chiton) as the main tunic of the hoplites during the later 5th century BC. It was made of two rectangles of linen (other materials were also used), which were stitched together from the sides to form a cylinder, leaving enough space at the top for the arms. An opening at the top was also left for the head. The cylinder was gathered up at the waist with a cloth belt using a reef knot, which made the cloth fall down over the belt, hiding it from view. To allow freedom of movement to the right arm, the seam at the right shoulder was taken apart, and the right hand was passed through the head opening.

The color of the tunic varied, but red (especially crimson) was increasingly the standard color preferred by hoplites during and after the Peloponnesian War.

The exomis could be worn in conjunction with the chlamys (also known as ephaptis) cape.

It was later adopted by the Romans.
