= Kegelhelm =

Conical ancient Greek helmet

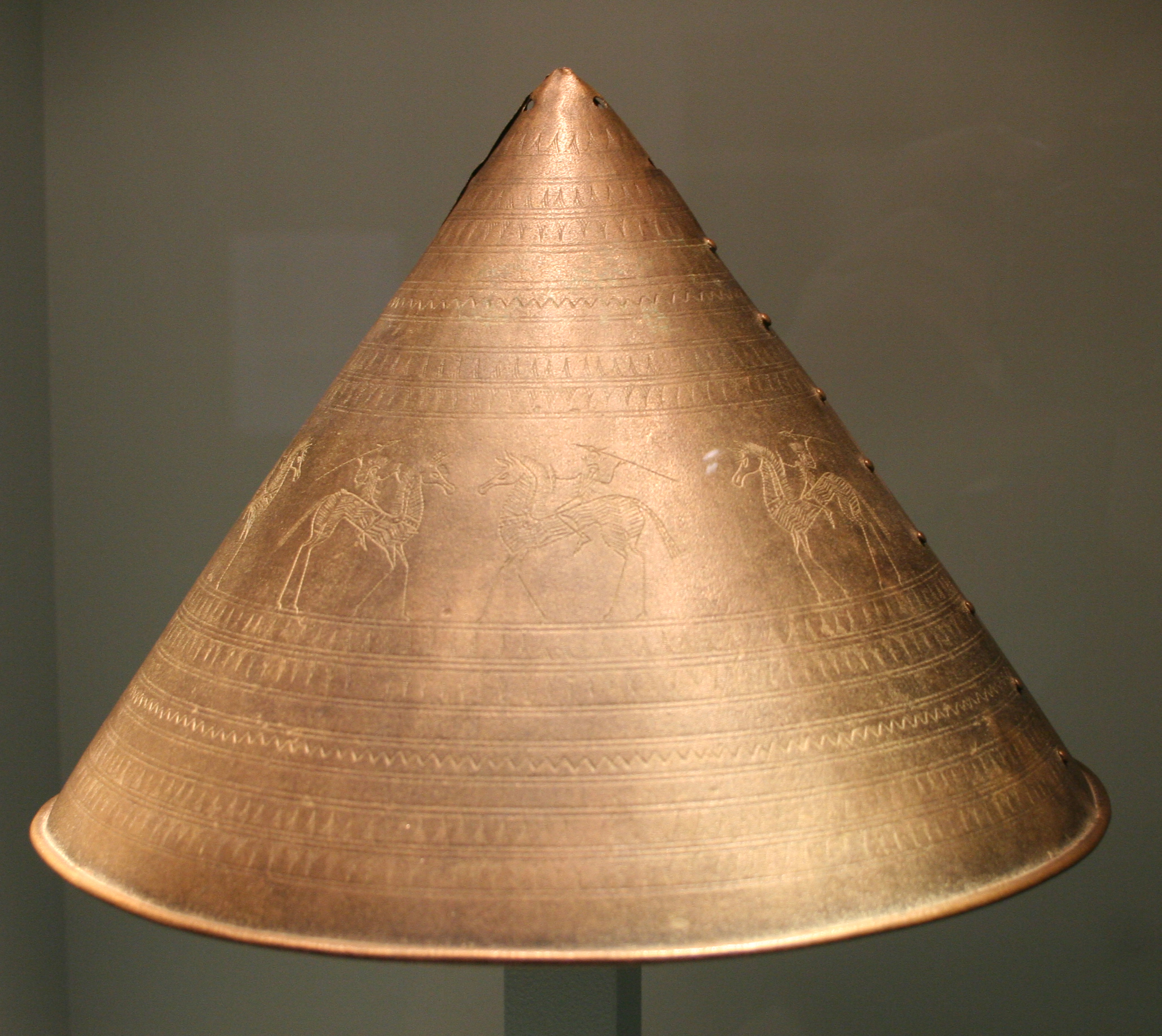
A simple Kegelhelm

The Kegelhelm (German: "cone helm") or Kegel type is a type of helmet. It is an open-faced helmet of roughly conical shape, sometimes with extensions at the sides to protect the cheeks, or a crest-holder on top. It was made of bronze, sometimes in several pieces. It was the progenitor of many Greek helmets, especially the "Illyrian" type helmet. It did not outlast the eighth century BC.

== Related reading ==
- Peter Connoly, Greece & Rome at War, ISBN 1-85367-303-X
