= Illyrian type helmet =

Ancient Greek helmet

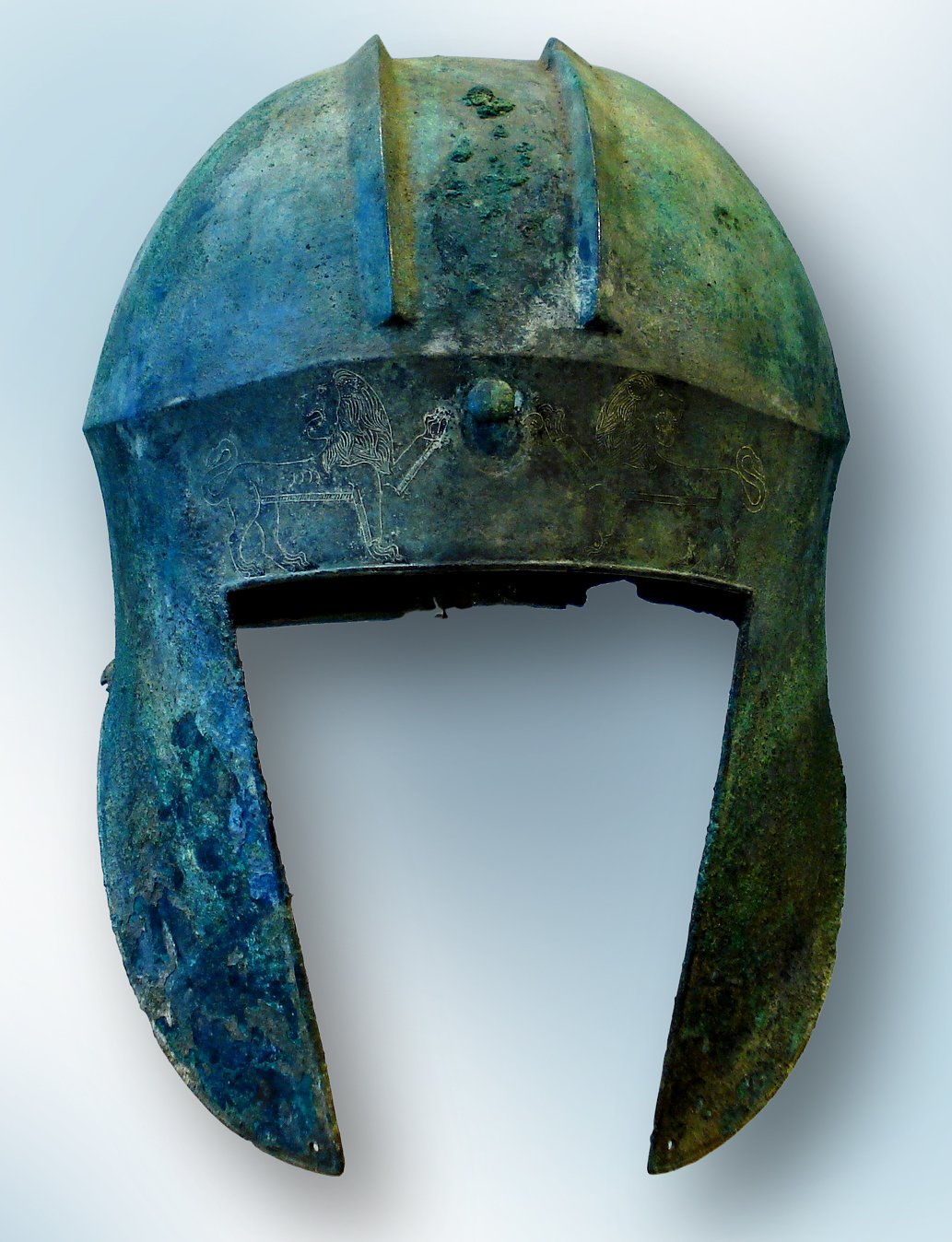
Bronze helmet of Illyrian type, Argolis (6th–5th centuries BC).

The Illyrian type helmet, or simply Illyrian helmet, (Note: There are various names which scholars have given to this type of helmet. Besides the widespread "Illyrian" or "Illyrian type", the terms "Greco-Illyrian", "Greek-Illyrian" or "Macedonian-Illyrian" have also been used. There were also proposals for alternative names, such as "Greek-Macedonian" by Pasko Kuzman (2006), and "Paionian" by Viktorija Sokolovska (1997). Rastko Vasić argues that the term Illyrian is the most widely used designation and considers it the most suitable. He notes that it is concise, practical, and leaves no ambiguity as to the type of helmet being discussed.) is a style of bronze helmet, which in its later variations covered the entire head and neck, and was open-faced in all of its forms. It originated in the Peloponnese, ancient Greece, and was developed during the 8th and 7th centuries BC (700–640 BC). Accurate representations on Corinthian vases are sufficient to indicate that the Illyrian type helmet was developed before 600 BC.

The Illyrian type helmet became popular in the western Balkans by the 5th and 4th centuries BC. It received its archaeological name due to the early finds in the historical region of Illyria. It was used by a variety of ancient peoples, including the ancient Greeks, the Illyrians, with whom it is most associated, and the ancient Macedonians.

== Archaeology ==
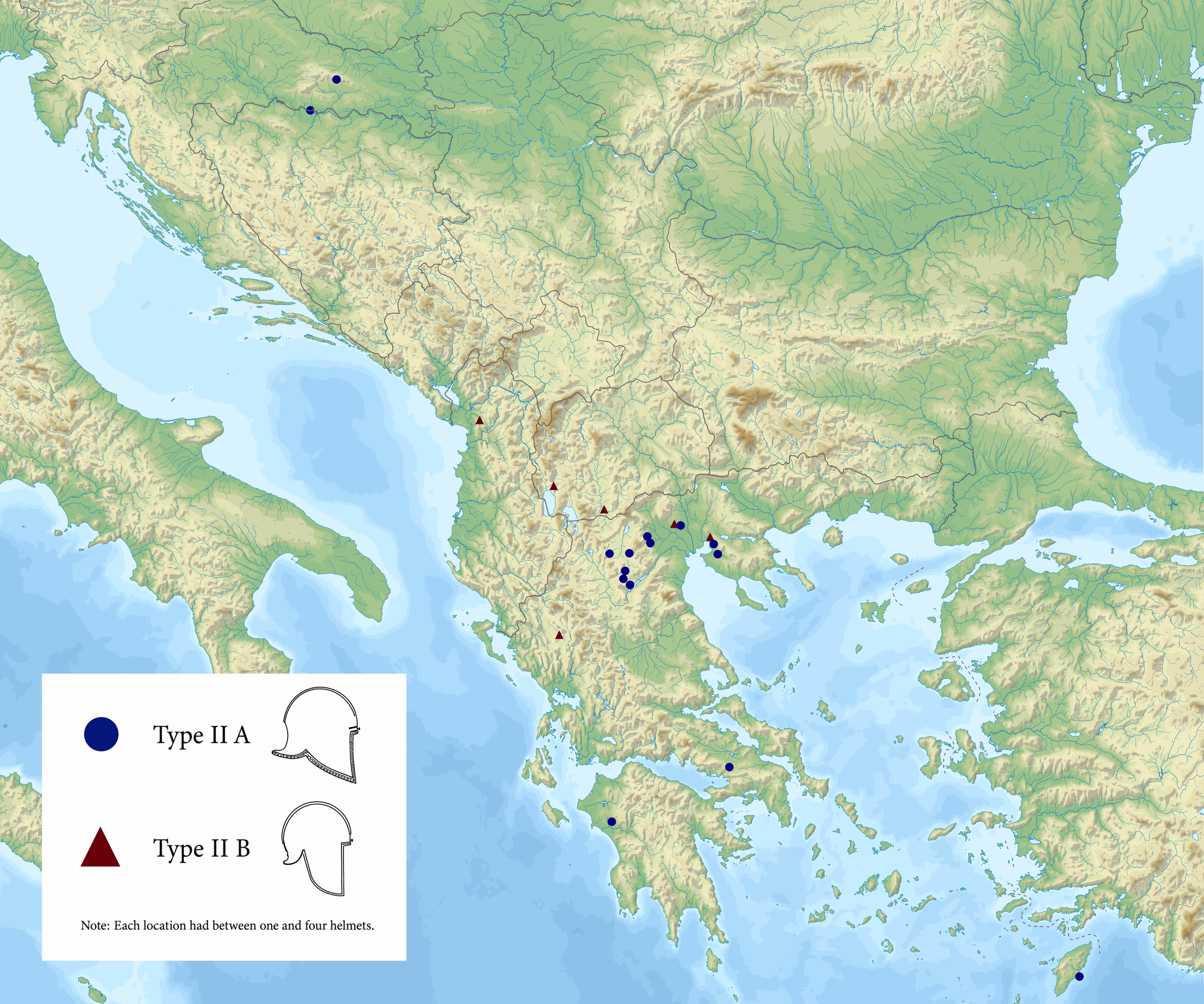
Distribution of Illyrian helmet subtypes II A and II B (7th–6th centuries BC)

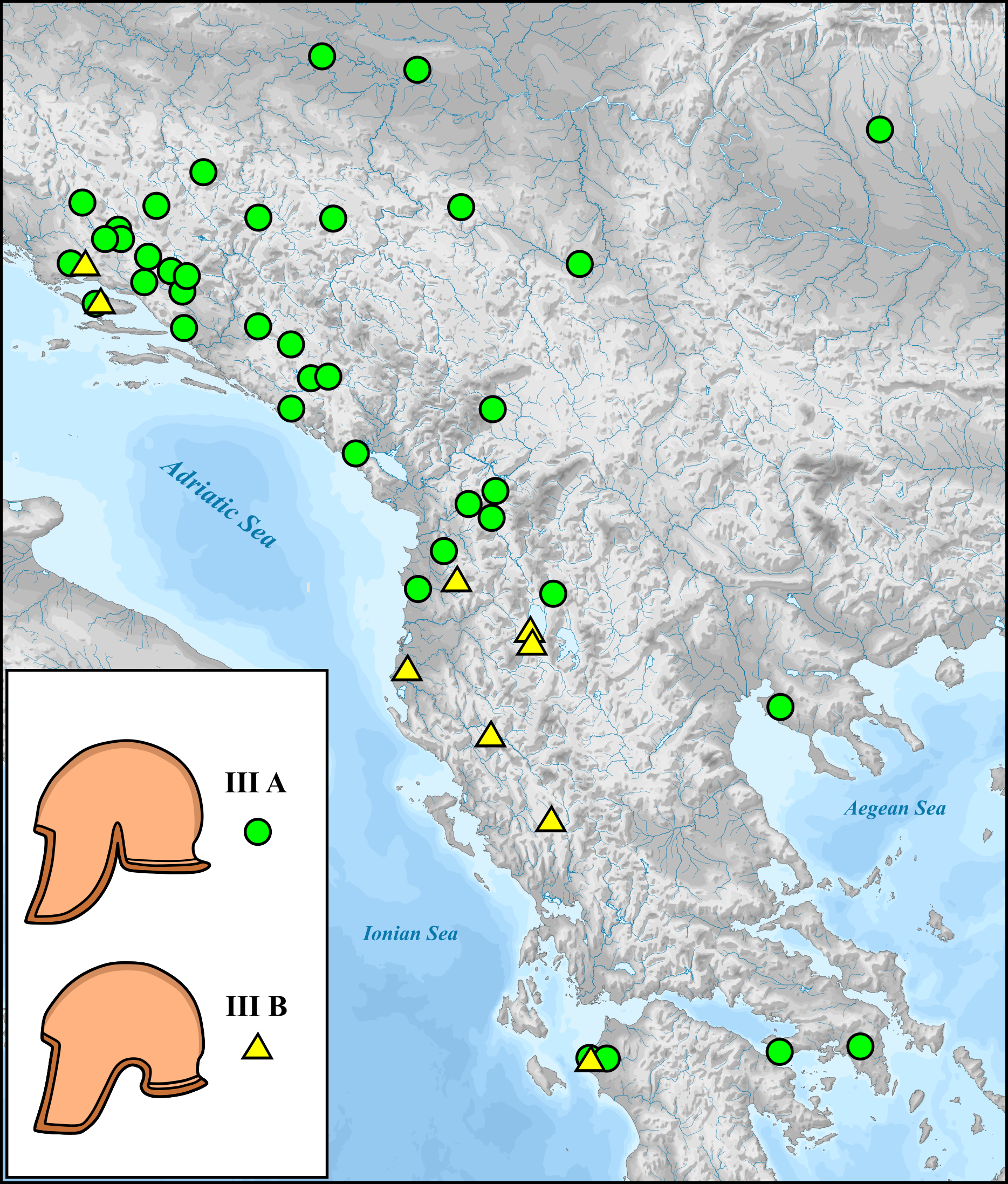
Distribution of Illyrian helmet subtypes III A and III B (6th–4th centuries BC)

According to archaeological evidence, the Illyrian type helmet evolved from the Kegelhelm (or Kegel type) of the Archaic Period found in Argos. The earliest Illyrian type helmets were developed in a workshop located in the northwestern Peloponnese (possibly Olympia), although the first Type II Illyrian helmets were created in Corinthian workshops. The first Type III helmets were created in workshops situated somewhere on the Illyrian coast of the Adriatic. The Illyrian type helmet did not obstruct the wearer's critical senses of vision though the first two varieties hampered hearing. There were four types of these helmets and all were open faced:

- Type I (c. 700–640 BC) left the neck unprotected and hampered hearing.
- Type II (c. 600 BC) offered neck protection and again hampered hearing.
- Type III (c. 550 BC) offered neck protection and allowed better hearing.
- Type IV (c. 500 BC) was similar to Type III but hearing was not impaired at all.

== Usage ==
The Illyrian helmet was used by a variety of ancient peoples, including the ancient Greeks, the Illyrians, with whom it is most associated, and the ancient Macedonians. Its use has also been documented among the Scythians and the Etruscans. The helmet is thought to have originated in the Peloponnese during the 8th-7th century BC and later spread to Illyria and other non-Greek regions.

According to Rastko Vasić, during the second phase of the helmets, spanning from the late 7th to much of the 6th century BC, they spread to Macedonia, where they were produced in large quantities. The transitional period, in the late 6th and early 5th centuries BC, was characterized by important diversification in form, with the helmets remaining common in Macedonia. In their late phase, during the 5th century BC, Illyrian helmets reached the height of their production and popularity, being widely used in Macedonia and in the western Balkans. During their final developmental phase, in the 4th century BC, they also occurred in significant numbers in the western Balkans.

According to Hermann Pflug and Vasić, the workshops which produced these helmets for the western Balkans were in the Greek colonies on the Adriatic, such as the Corinthian–Corcyraean colonies of Epidamnos and Apollonia; or either in Greece according to Pflug. Vasić questioned whether these two workshops could have met the growing demand during the second half of the 5th and the 4th centuries BC, and hypothesized that other workshops may have been involved. He refers to Diodorus' account of Dionysius I of Syracuse sending 500 panoplies to the Illyrians in 385 BC in return for their military assistance against Greek cities. Although Diodorus does not specify the type of helmets included, Vasić considers it possible that some of them were probably of the Illyrian type, suggesting that Syracuse served as a potential South Italian workshop. Pflug suggested a similar hypothesis, however, both Pflug and Vasić concluded that more evidence was needed. According to Andreas Lippert and Joachim Matzinger, the variants of helmet type III may have been produced in the workshops of Epidamnos and Apollonia, where they may have been adapted to the preferences of the local tribes or elite warrior groups. They observe that the decorated variants "III A 1" and "III A 2" occur predominantly in Dalmatia, while the morphologically distinct types "III B" and "III A 3" are mainly represented in Albania and Macedonia. However, they emphasize that direct archaeological evidence for weapon workshops producing the Illyrian helmets is still lacking. According to Jason R. Abdale, it is unclear whether the Illyrians imported these helmets or manufactured them natively, and suggests that both practices occurred.

A variety of the helm had also spread to Italy based on its appearance on ivory reliefs and on a silver bowl at the "Bernardini" tomb at Praeneste. The helmet became obsolete in most parts of Greece in the early 5th century BC. Its use in Illyria had ended by the 4th century BC.

Although examples have been discovered across southeastern Europe and on both sides of the Danube, the later variants of the Illyrian type helmet are particularly well represented in the region that later became the Roman province of Illyricum. This distribution suggests that the helmet underwent important regional development there, and it also came to serve as a marker of elite status and high social rank.

== Gallery ==
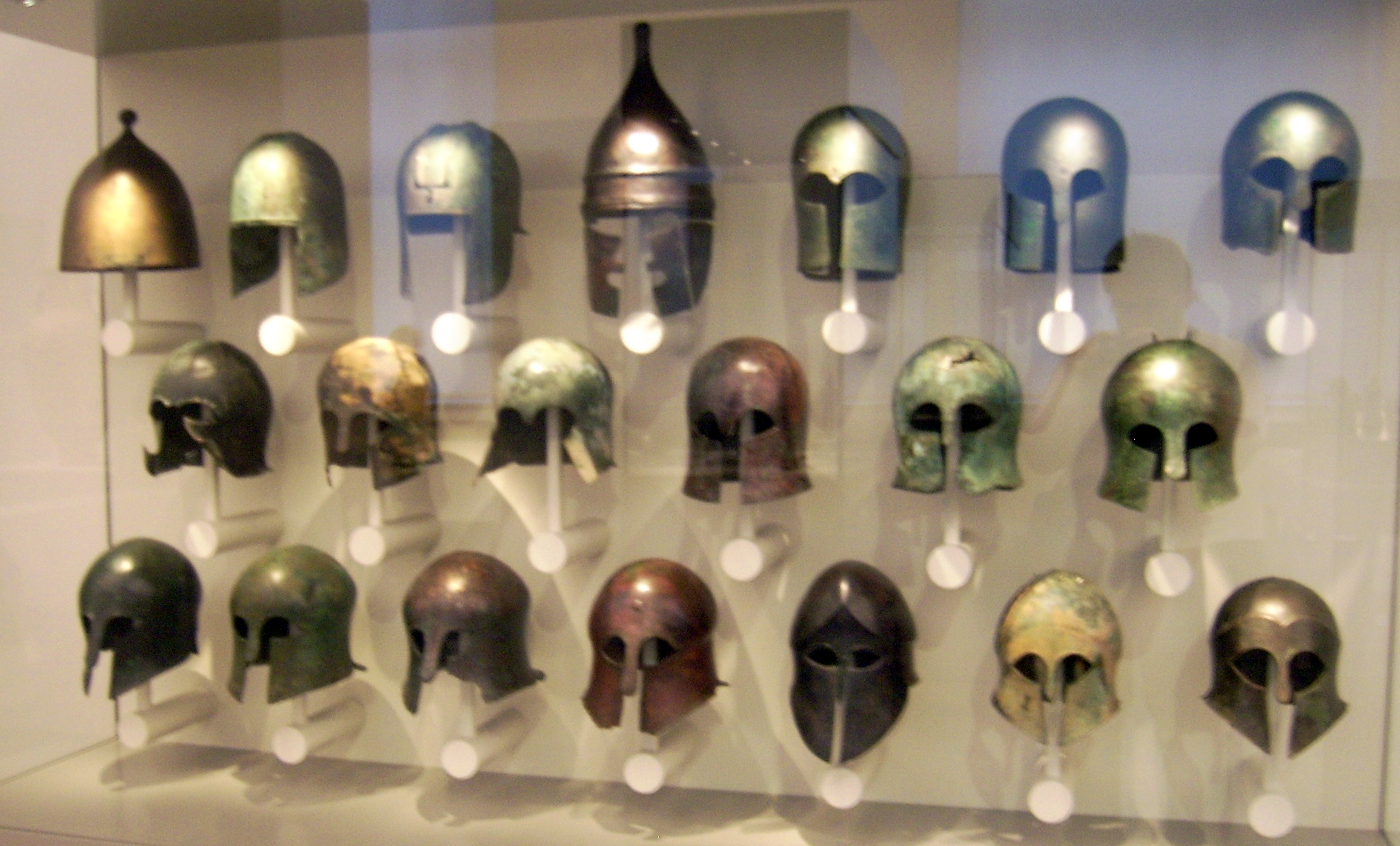
Types of Ancient Greek helmets; top line, third from the left: Greco-Illyrian type helmet. Antikensammlung in Altes Museum, Berlin.

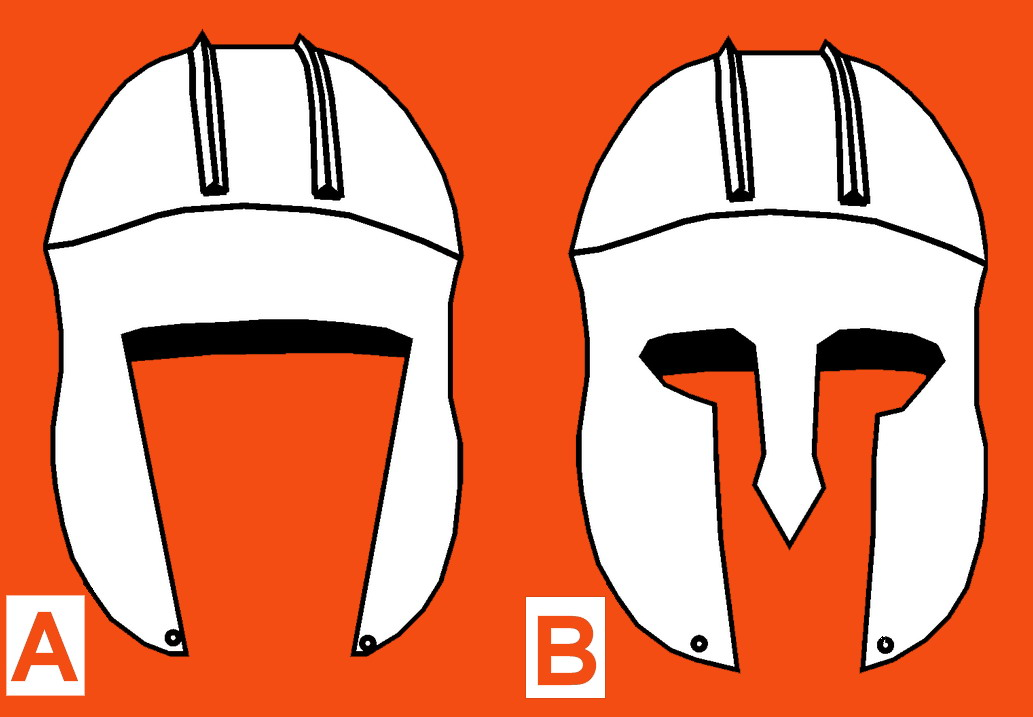
Illyrian type helmet (left) juxtaposed to a Corinthian type helmet (right).

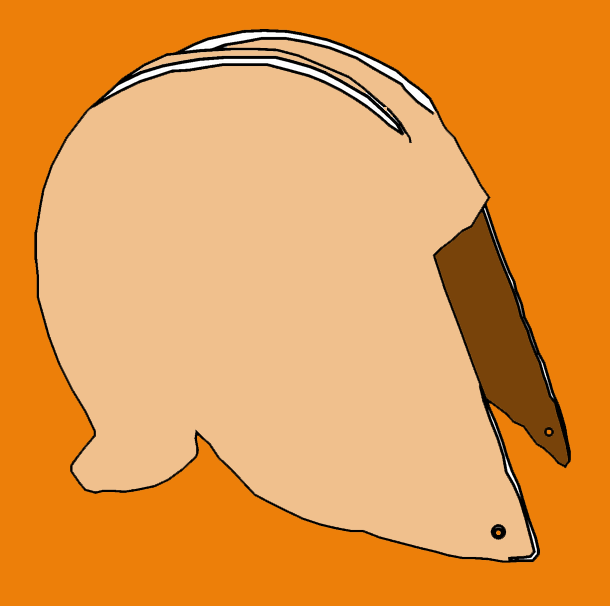
Illyrian type helmet from Budva, Montenegro (c. 4th century BC).

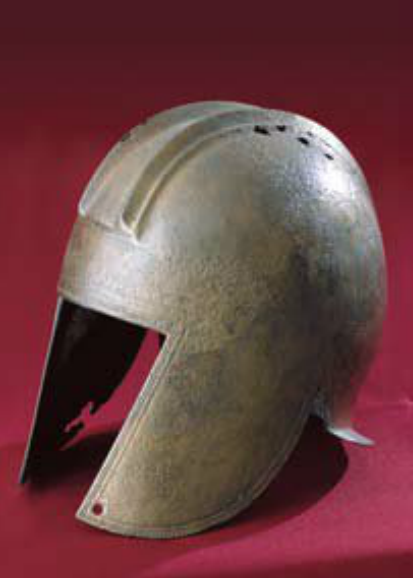
Illyrian helmet from Budva, Montenegro (4th century BC).

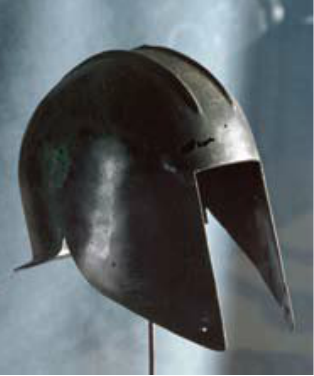
Illyrian helmet from Kličevo, Montenegro (Upper Bronze Age).

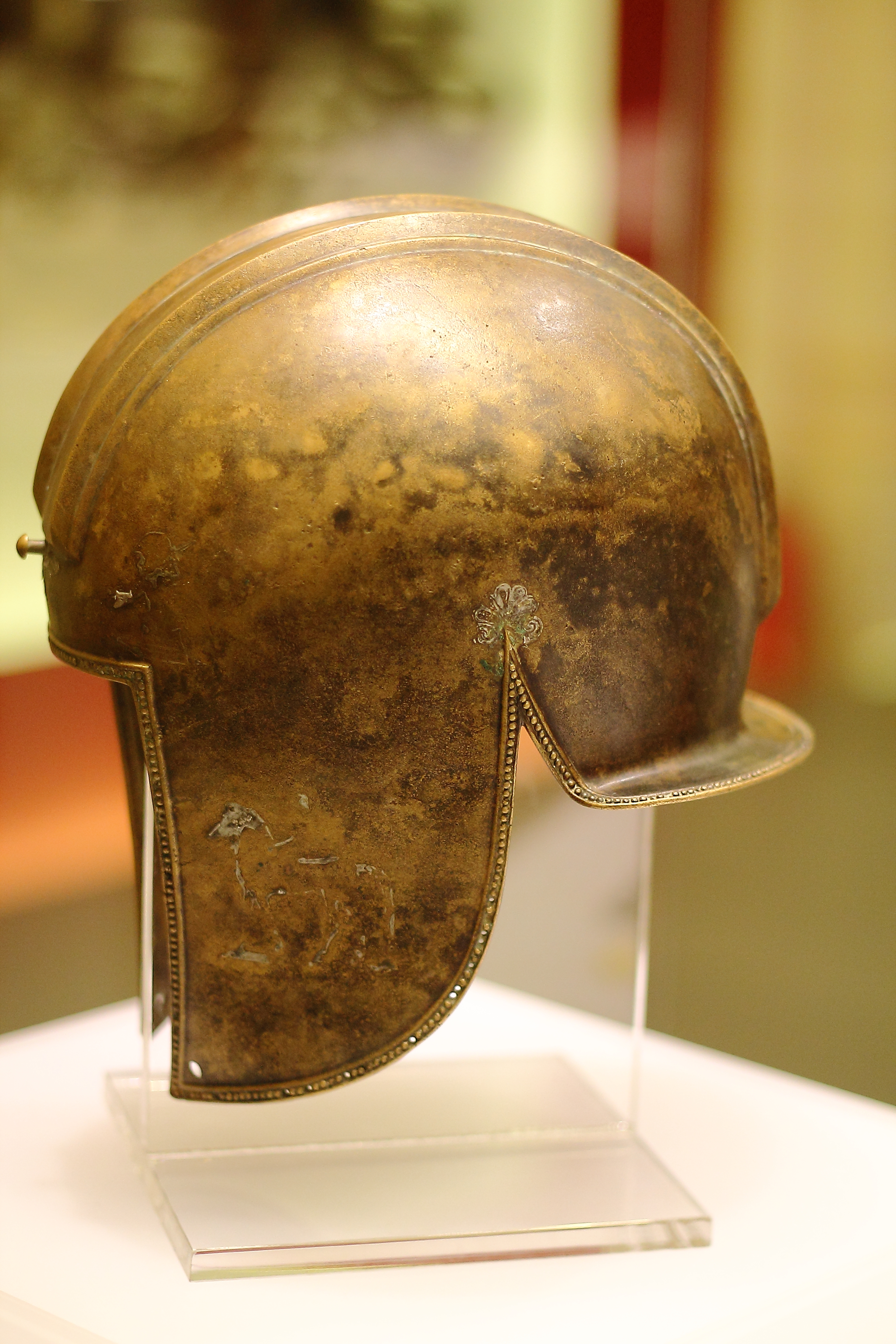
Illyrian helmet from Timis, Romania with horseman and six rose-petal decorations (6th–4th century BC).
