= Attic helmet =

Helmet originating in Classical Greece

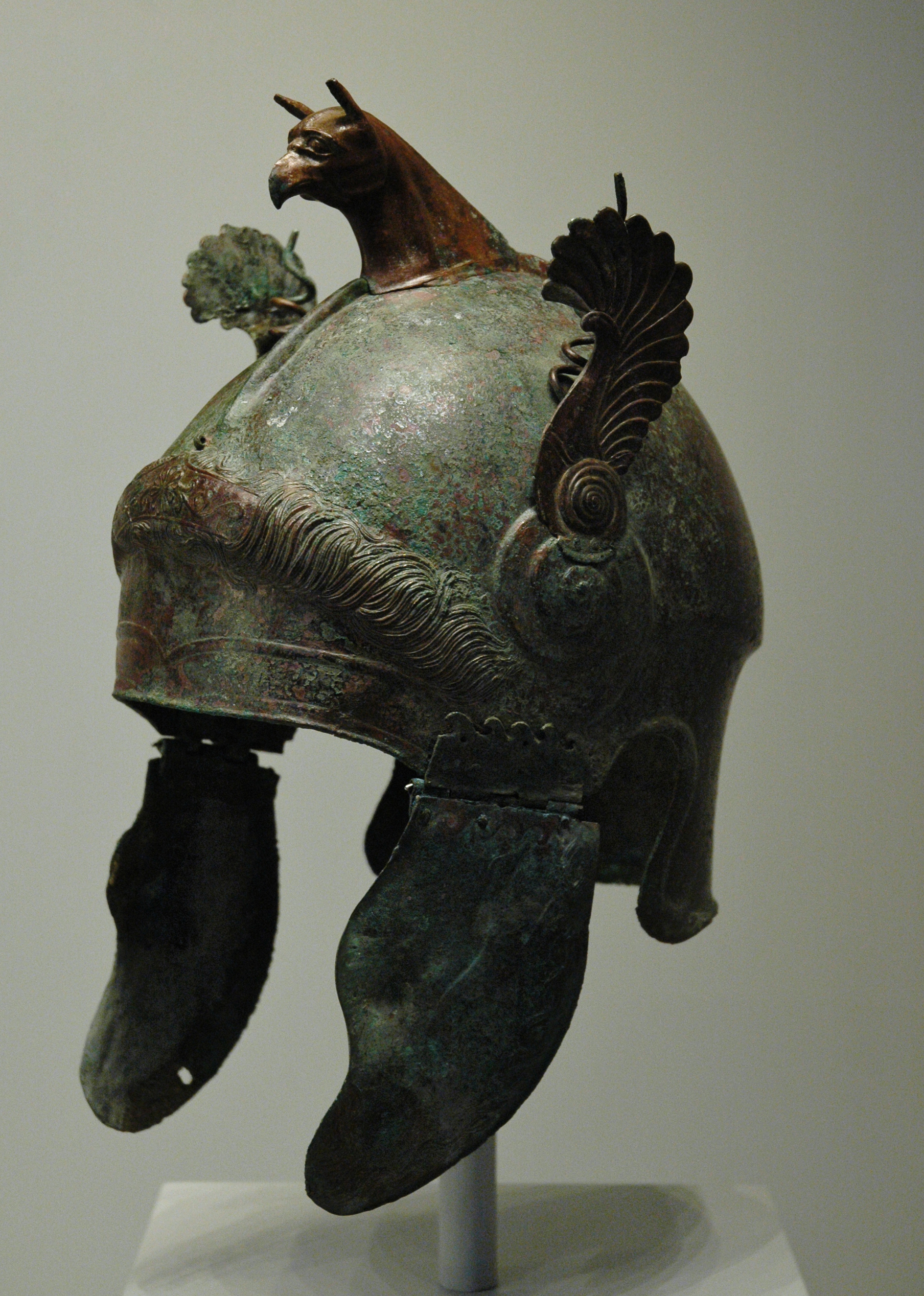
A ceremonial Attic helmet from Southern Italy, ca. 300 BC

The Attic helmet was a type of helmet that originated in Classical Greece and was widely used in Italy and the Hellenistic world until well into the Roman Empire. Its name is a modern historiographic convention: "Terms such as Illyrian and Attic are used in archaeology for convenience to denote a particular type of helmet and do not imply its origin."

The Attic helmet was similar to the Chalcidian helmet but lacked a nose guard. Although its use was not as widespread in Greece itself as the Corinthian or Phrygian types, the Attic helmet became very popular in Italy, where most examples have been found. Many Italian peoples used variations of the attic helmet, but archaeologically it has been especially prominent in Samnite and Lucanian burials and their associated art (frescos, etc.).

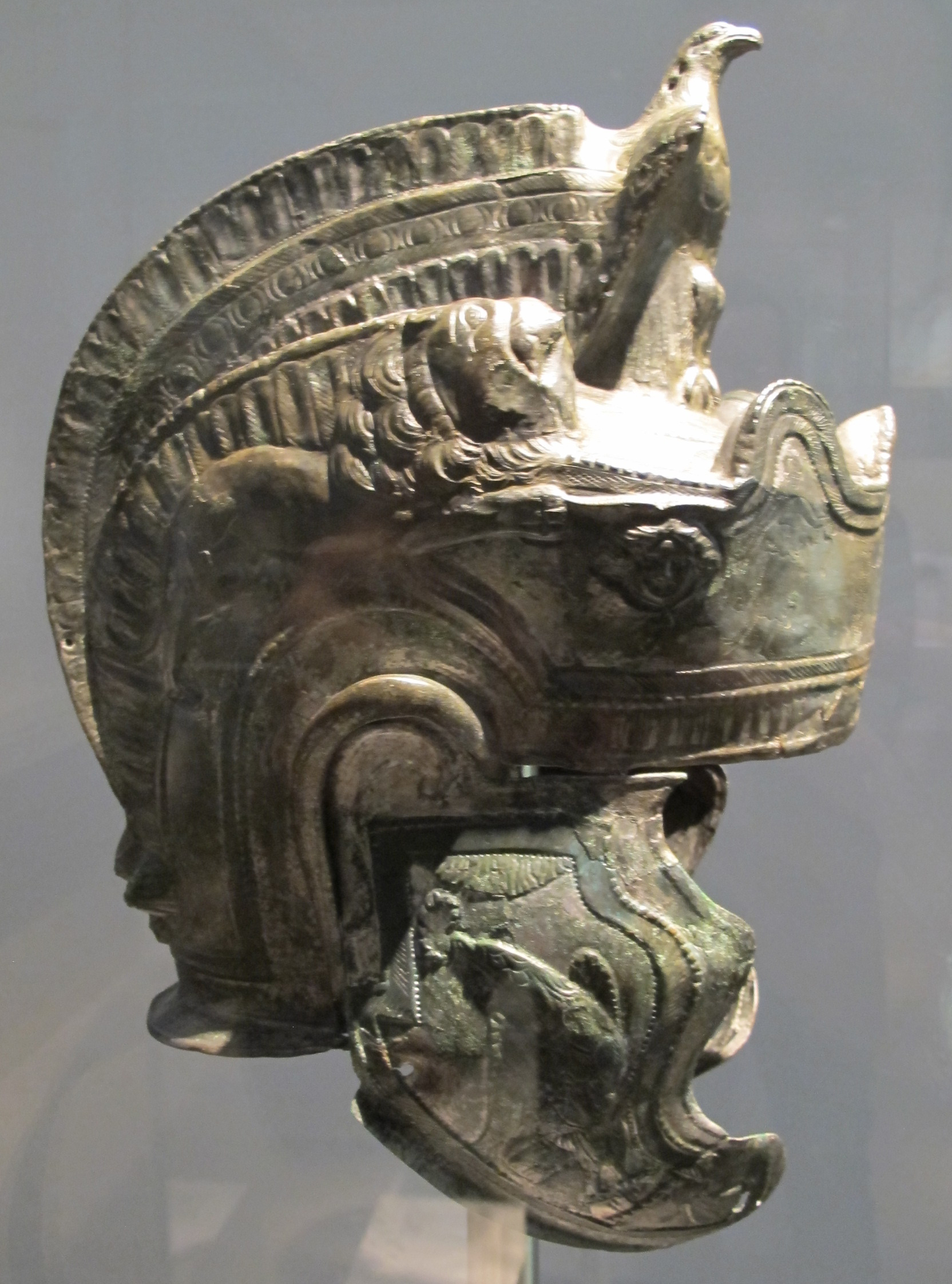
Roman "pseudo-Attic" helmet, 2nd century AD

As an artistic motif, variations of the Attic helmet long outlasted other contemporary helmet types, being used to impart an archaic look to depictions of generals, emperors and Praetorians throughout the Hellenistic and Roman periods. As such, a form of Attic helmet has become part of the popular image of a Roman officer, as found in art from the Renaissance onwards or in earlier Hollywood productions. However, no archaeological remains of this type of helmet have been found to date. The closest surviving Imperial Roman helmet to the type illustrated in relief sculpture dates to the 2nd century AD and was found in Bavaria. It has been classified as a "pseudo-Attic" helmet by some scholars. It is of tinned bronze and is very elaborately decorated with an integral crest raised from the skull incorporating an eagle.

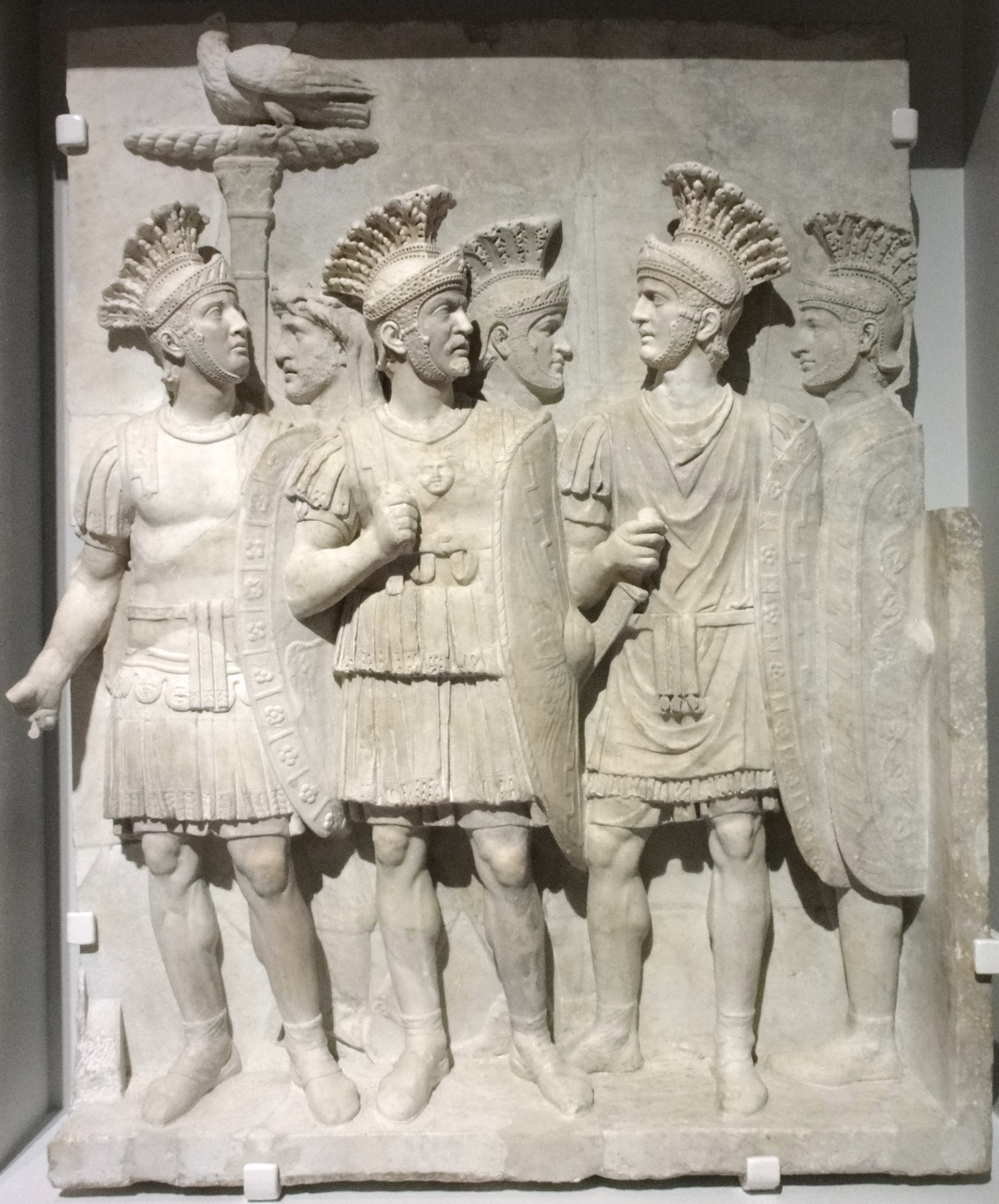
The Praetorians Relief from the Arch of Claudius showing the type of Attic helmet, with an upstanding browband, commonly associated with Roman officers. This helmet type is only known from representations in art.

== Bibliography ==
- Connolly, Peter (1998). Greece and Rome at War. London: Greenhill Books. ISBN 978-1-85367-303-0.
