= Makhaira =

Ancient Greek bladed weapon

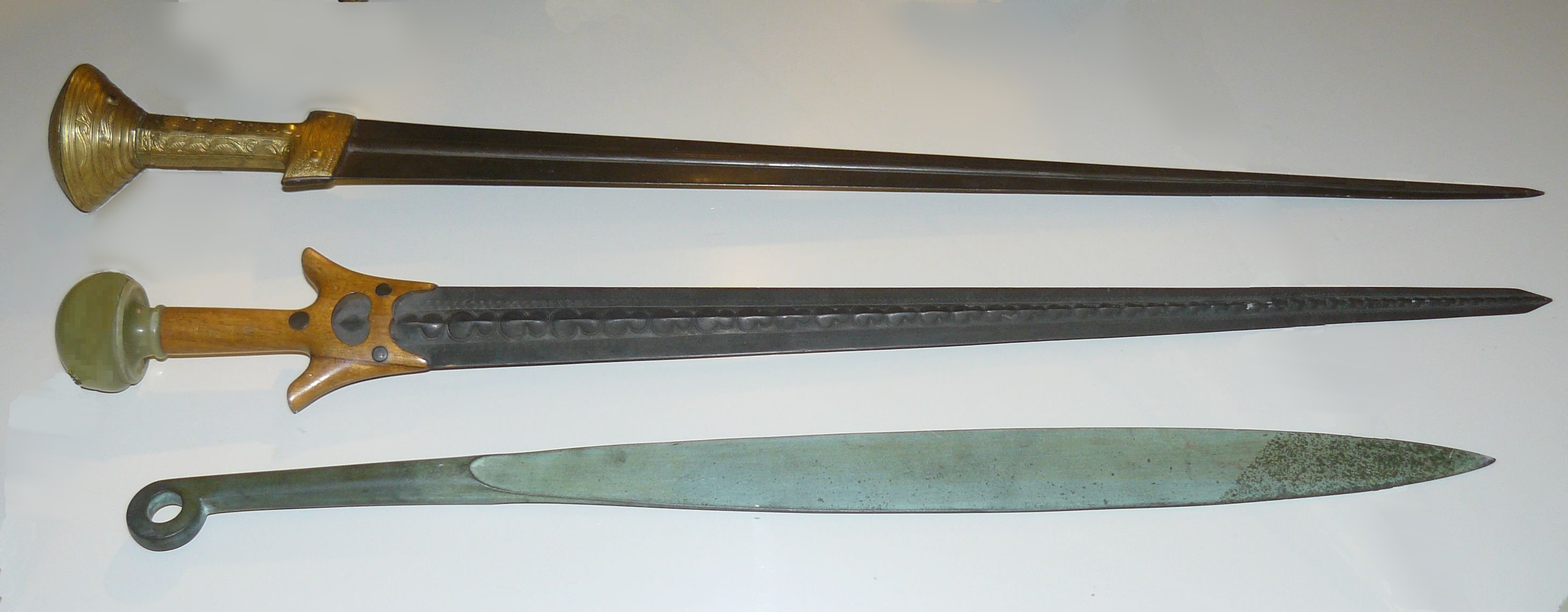
Reconstructions of Mycenaean swords, the bottom one a makhaira-type sword

The makhaira is a type of Ancient Greek bladed weapon and tool, generally a large knife or sword, similar in appearance to the modern-day machete, with a single cutting edge.

== Terminology ==
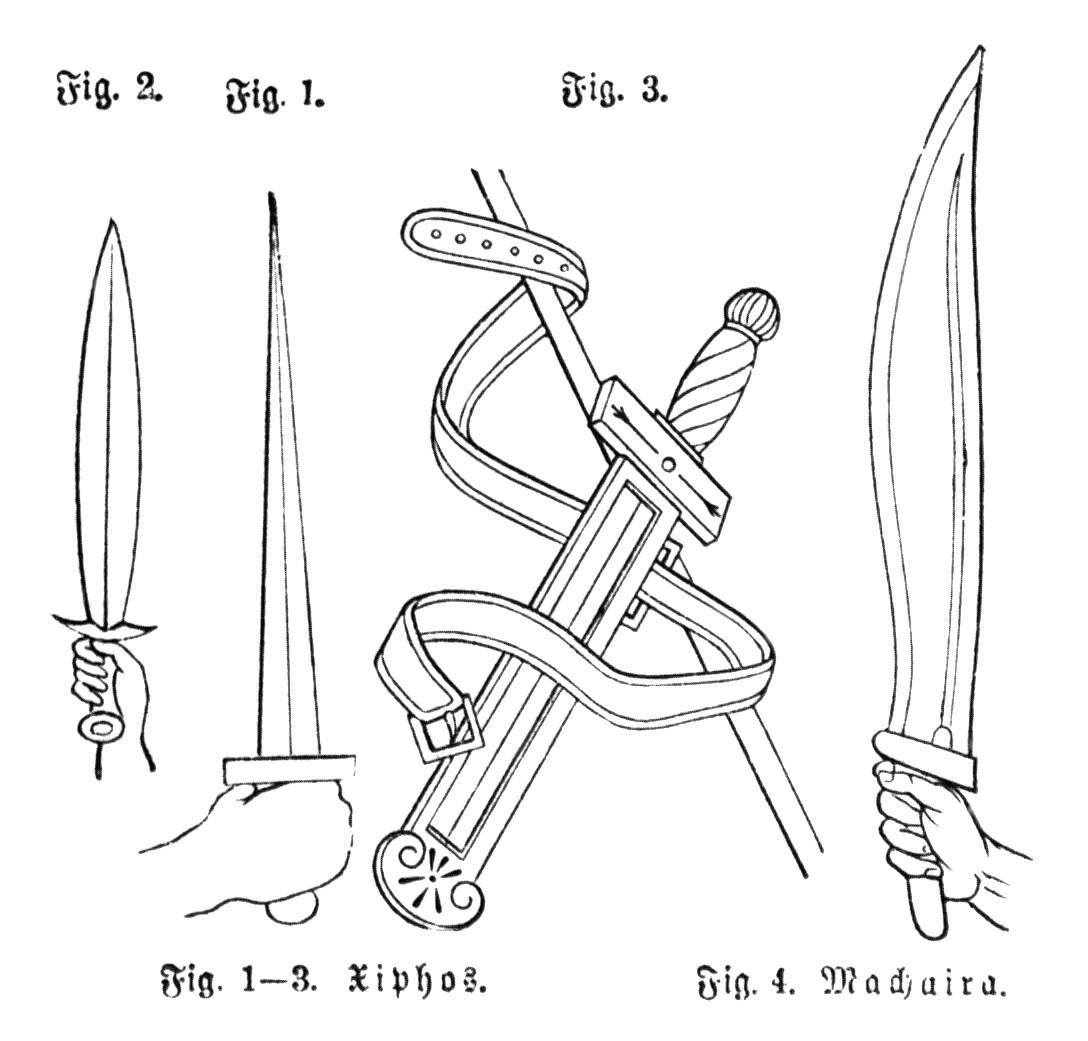
Antique swords, fig. 1-3: Xiphos, fig. 4: Makhaira.

The Greek word μάχαιρα (mákhaira, plural mákhairai), also transliterated machaira or machaera, is possibly related to μάχη (mákhē) "a battle", μάχεσθαι (mákhesthai) "to fight".

Homer mentions the makhaira, but as a domestic knife of no great size. In period texts, μάχαιρα has a variety of meanings, and can refer to virtually any knife or sword, even a surgeon's scalpel, but in a martial context it frequently refers to a type of one-edged sword; a sword designed primarily to cut rather than thrust.

The Koine of the New Testament uses the word makhaira to refer to a sword generically, not making any particular distinction between native blades and the gladius of the Roman soldier. This ambiguity appears to have contributed to the apocryphal malchus, a supposedly short curved sword used by Peter to cut off the ear of a slave named Malchus during the arrest of Jesus. While such a weapon clearly is a makhaira by ancient definition, the imprecise nature of the word as used in the New Testament cannot provide any conclusive answer.

Makhaira entered classical Latin as machaera, "a sword". The dimachaerus was a type of Roman gladiator that fought with two swords. In modern Greek, μαχαίρι means "knife".

Modern scholars distinguish the makhaira from the kopis (an ancient term of similar meaning) based on whether the blade is forward curved (kopis), or not (makhaira).

== Characteristics ==
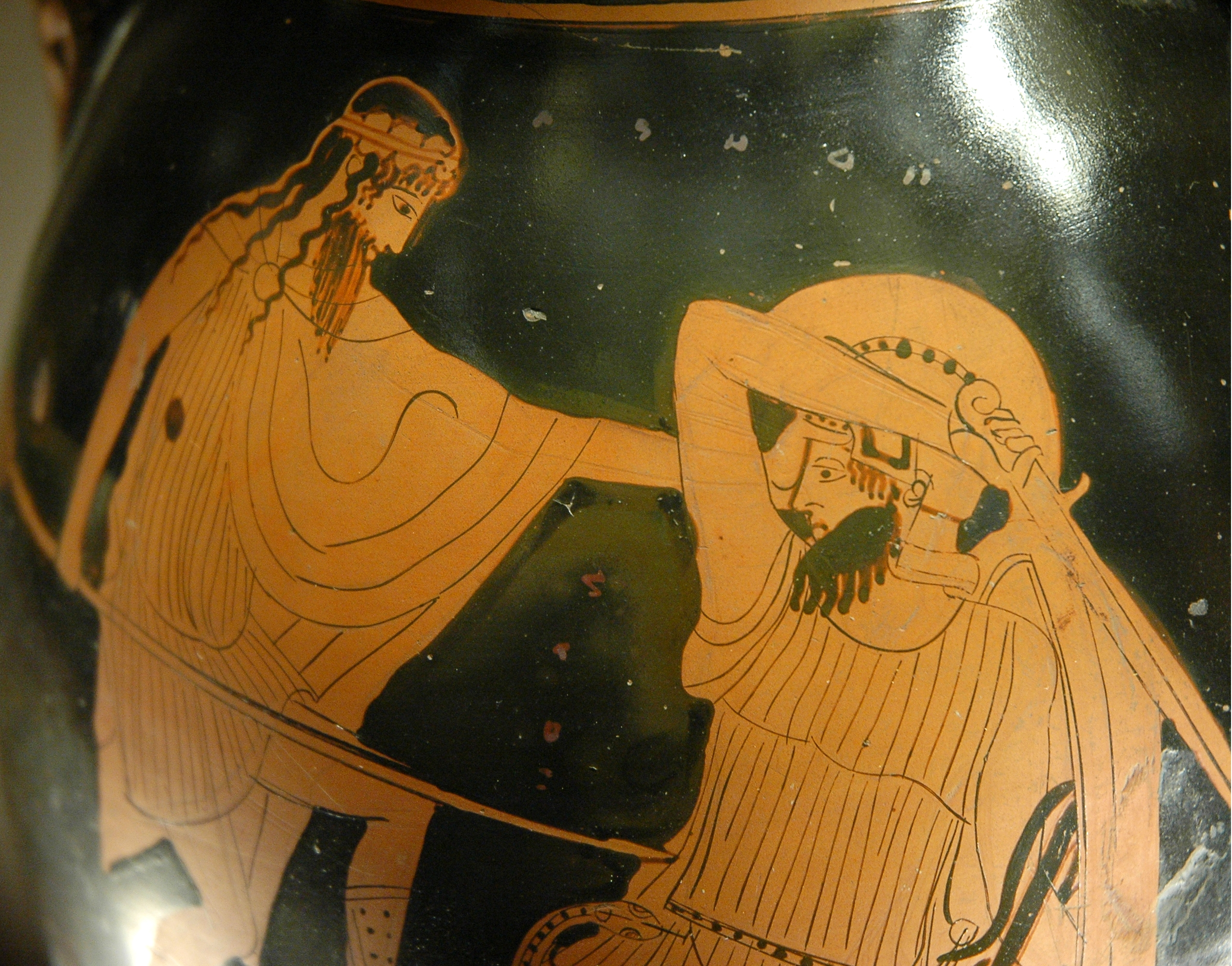
The figure on the right is wielding a makhaira - indicated by its asymmetric guard and pommel and the curve of the cutting edge (uppermost in the image) of the blade whilst the back of the blade is flat. Attic figured pelike c. 460BC.

Makhaira were of various sizes and shapes, being regional, and not exclusively Greek. Greek art shows the Lacedaemonian and Persian soldiers employing swords with a single cutting edge, but Persian records show that their primary infantry sword was two edged and straight, similar to the Greek xiphos (cf. acinaces). Greek vase painting begins to show makhairai very infrequently from c. 530 BC, though their depiction is increasingly common on 'red figure' ceramics from c. 510 BC onwards.

The makhaira depicted in artworks was single-edged, having an expanded convex portion to the cutting part of the blade towards its tip. This concentrated weight, therefore momentum, to this part of the blade; facilitating particularly forceful cuts. The shape of the blade allowed the makhaira the potential to cut through bone.

Despite their relatively frequent depictions in art, archaeological remains of this type of sword are rare.

== Use ==
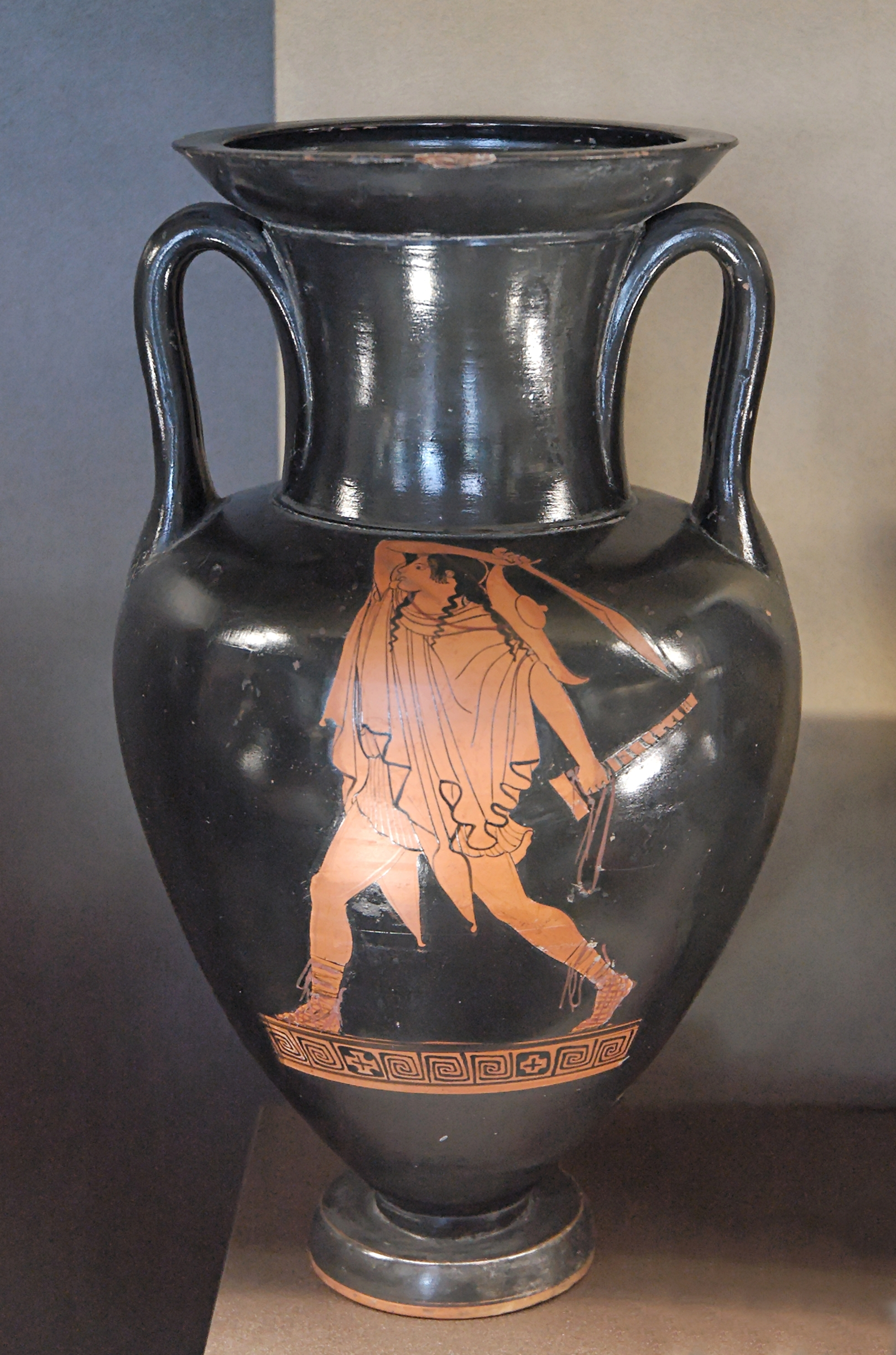
A man wielding a makhaira. Red figure amphora c. 460 BC

While Xenophon states that the xiphos was the conventional sword used by the Greek soldier of his time, he recommended the makhaira for cavalry. "I recommend a kopis rather than a xiphos, because from the height of a horse's back the cut of a machaira will serve you better than the thrust of a xiphos." (Xenophon, 12:11). His reasoning concurs with the general practice of arming cavalry with cutting swords through the ages. Greek art along with Xenophon's further commentary suggests that the sword he intended for the cavalry was wider than the more modern sabre; more akin to the falchion or even machete.

Archeological evidence suggests that the makhaira was more predominant in areas that were not so focused on using the phalanx, and instead focused more on cavalry.

== See also ==
- Falcata
- Kopis
- Sica
- Xiphos
- Kukri
- Sword classification is not always exact and can change over time and between cultures.
- Machaerus, military outpost of the Hasmoneans

== Animals ==
There are examples of animals that have makhaira or machaira in their names.

- Machairoceratops
- Machairasaurus
- Machairodontinae (commonly known as saber-tooth cats)
- Makhaira
- Makaira

== Bibliography ==
- Gordon, D.H. (1958) Scimitars, Sabres and Falchions.in Man, Vol 58, Royal Anthropological Institute of Great Britain and Ireland.
- Liddell & Scott. A Greek-English Lexicon, 9th edition, 1996.
- Xenophon, On Horsemanship.
- F. Quesada, Machaira, kopis, falcata= https://web.archive.org/web/20090219135233/http://www.ffil.uam.es/equus/warmas/online/machairakopisfalcata.pdf
