= Khopesh =

Ancient Egyptian sword

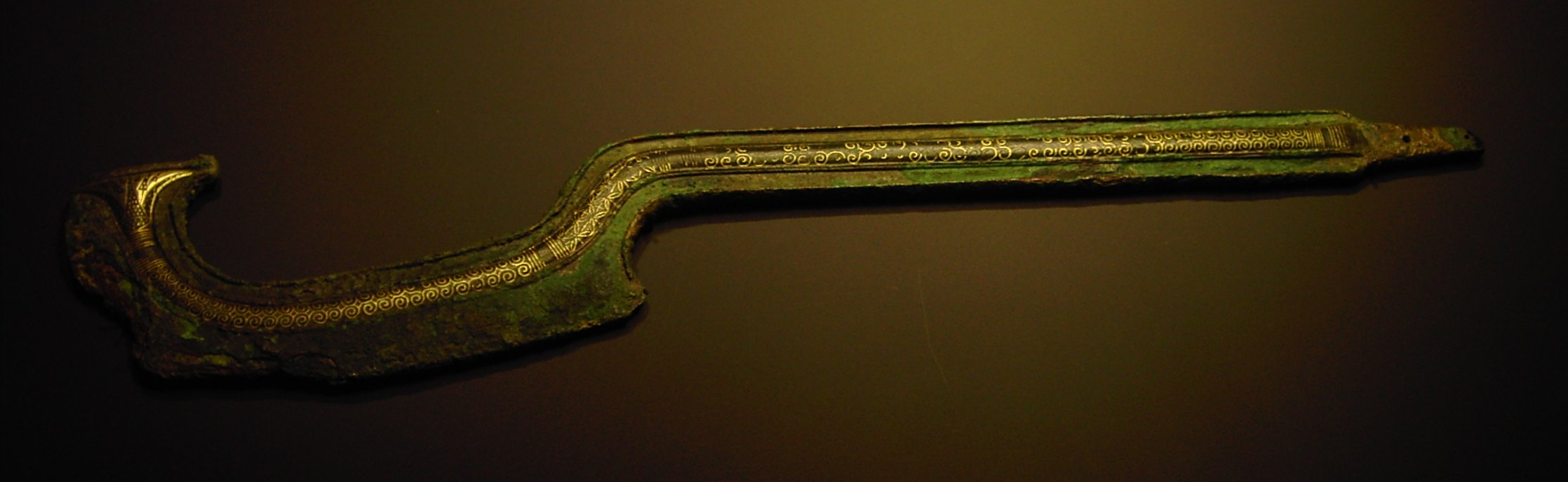
- 18th century BC khopesh found in Nablus; the blade is decorated with electrum inlays.
- Type: Sword
- Place of origin: Lower Egypt under the Hyksos (15th Dynasty)

Service history
- In service: c. 3000 – 1300 BC
- Used by: Hyksos; New Kingdom of Egypt; Kingdom of Israel and Judah; Canaanite city-states; Kingdom of Kush
- Wars: Battle of Kadesh; Battle of Qarqar

Specifications
- Length: avg. 50–60 cm (20–24 in)
- Blade type: Curved

The khopesh (ḫpš; also vocalized khepesh) is an Egyptian sickle-like sword that developed from battle axes. The sword style originated in Western Asia during the Bronze Age and was introduced in the Second Intermediate Period. The khopesh became more common in the New Kingdom, and is often depicted with kings in statues and murals.

== Etymology ==
Aa1 Q3 N37 F23 F51(Coffin Texts)
ḫpš ('leg')
in hieroglyphs

The word khopesh may have been derived from "leg", as in "leg of beef", because of their similarity in shape. The hieroglyph for ḫpš ('leg') is found as early as during the time of the Coffin Texts (the First Intermediate Period). However, on the 196 BC Rosetta Stone, it is referenced as the "sword" determinative in a hieroglyph block, with the spelled letters of kh, p, and sh to say:

And there shall be set up a statue of the King of the South and the North, Ptolemy, the everliving, the god who appeareth, the lord of benefactions, and its name shall be called 'Ptolemy, the Avenger of Baq-t (Egypt)', whereof the interpretation is 'Ptolemy, the strong one of Kam-t' (Egypt), and a statue of the god of the city, giving to him a royal sword of victory ...

== Description ==
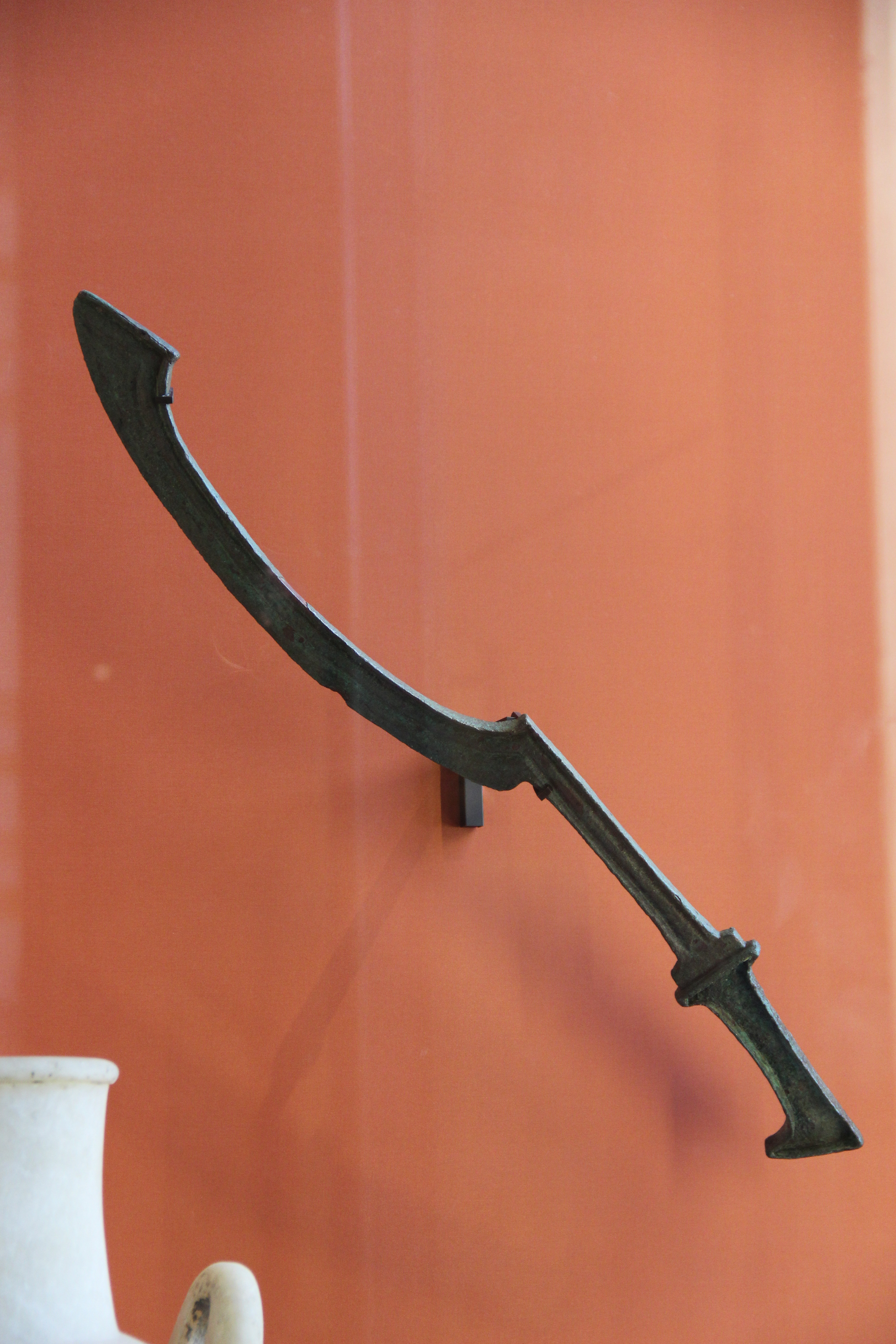
A bronze Khopesh sickle sword with Ramesses II cartouche inscribed, located at the Louvre.

A typical khopesh is 50–60 cm (20–24 in) in length, though smaller examples also exist. The inside curve of the weapon could be used to trap an opponent's arm, or to pull an opponent's shield out of the way. These weapons changed from bronze to iron in the New Kingdom period. The blade is only sharpened on the outside portion of the curved end. Examples have been found with dull edges, most likely indicating they were of ceremonial purpose. The khopesh evolved from the epsilon or similar crescent-shaped axes that were used in warfare. The khopesh also evolved from the crescent-shaped swords that came with settlers to the delta region from Western Asia. The khopesh was also a ceremonial object shown alongside depictions of kings and represents a symbol of power and conquest.

== History ==
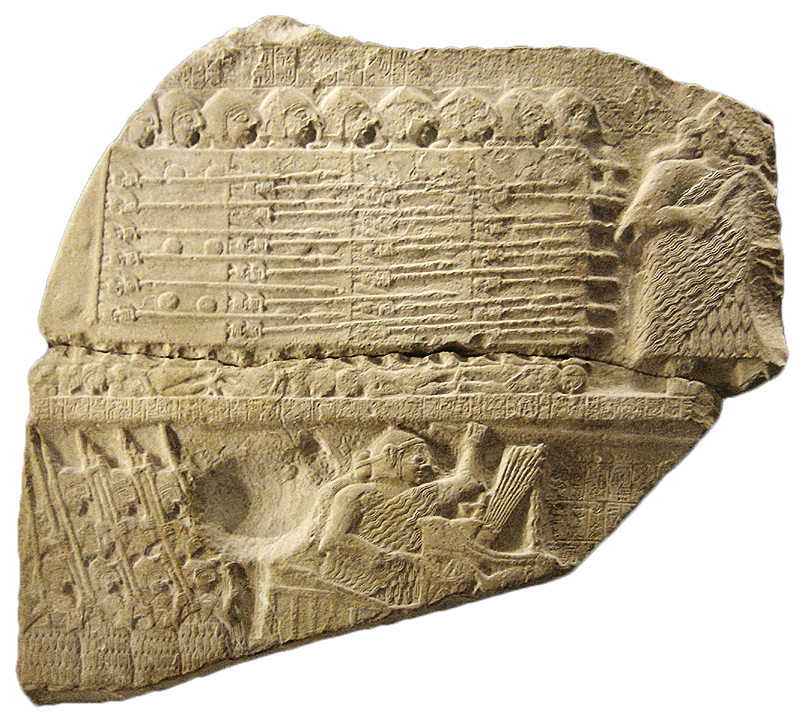
A fragment of the Stele of the Vultures in which the earliest depiction of a khopesh is found. The khopesh can be seen in the hands of the figures at the top and bottom left portion of the fragment.

The khopesh did not originate in Egypt and was a foreign technology that was introduced to Egypt during the Second Intermediate Period when the Hyksos ruled Lower Egypt. The Hyksos most likely originated from the Levant and brought new technological advances to Egypt. The Hyksos brought new techniques in pottery, bronze working, and weaving, they also brought new weapons like composite bows, chariots, and curved swords that were the precursors to the khopesh. The earliest known depiction of a khopesh is from the Stele of the Vultures, depicting King Eannatum of Lagash wielding the weapon; this would date the khopesh to at least 2500 BC.

The height of the use of the khopesh was during the New Kingdom Dynasties in which warfare and imperial conquest were key features of the New Kingdoms. The khopesh fell out of use around 1300 BC. Ancient Egyptian soldiers carried the khopesh with various weapons such as axes, spears, maces, daggers, bows, and war chariots. Outside of active warfare, the khopesh is often featured alongside depictions of Kings as a symbol of power and conquest.

Although some examples have clearly sharpened edges, many examples have dull edges that apparently were never intended to be sharp. It may therefore be possible that some khopeshes found in high-status graves were ceremonial variants. Various pharaohs are depicted with a khopesh, and some have been found in royal graves, such as the two examples found with Tutankhamun.

=== Examples in art ===
Depictions of the khopesh are also common in carvings from the New Kingdom Period. Carvings typically show the khopesh being wielded by a King in battle or while in a ceremonial setting. This use of the khopesh is used to associate kings with concepts of power and conquest.

- In an ostracon from the New Kingdom, a depiction of Ramesses IV is shown wielding a khopesh used to smite his enemies. The ostracon came from the reign of Ramesses IV putting its creation around 1153–1147 B.C. It is currently in possession of the MFA Boston.
- A plaster relief on the exterior of the Hypostyle Hall at Karnack shows a depiction of Seti I from the 19th dynasty in a battle scene with a war chariot and a raised khopesh. In the scene, Seti I is trampling a group of enemies who are depicted as Libyans.

The Merneptah Stele from the New Kingdom depicts Merneptah, the fourth king of the 19th dynasty being given a khopesh from the God Amun after his victory over the Libyans in the north.

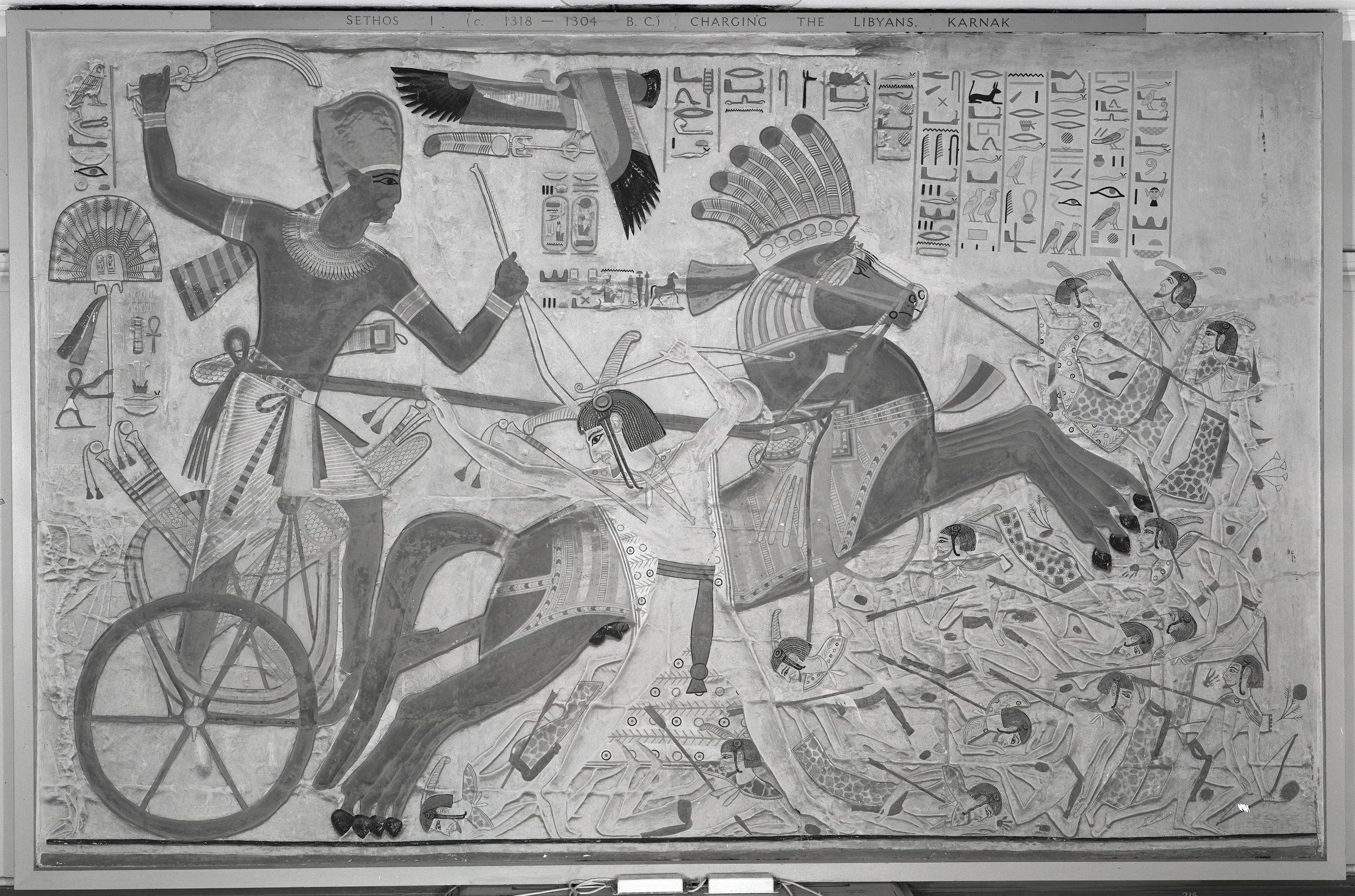
Mural of Seti I holding a khopesh while riding in a war chariot and trampling Libyans found at Karnak.

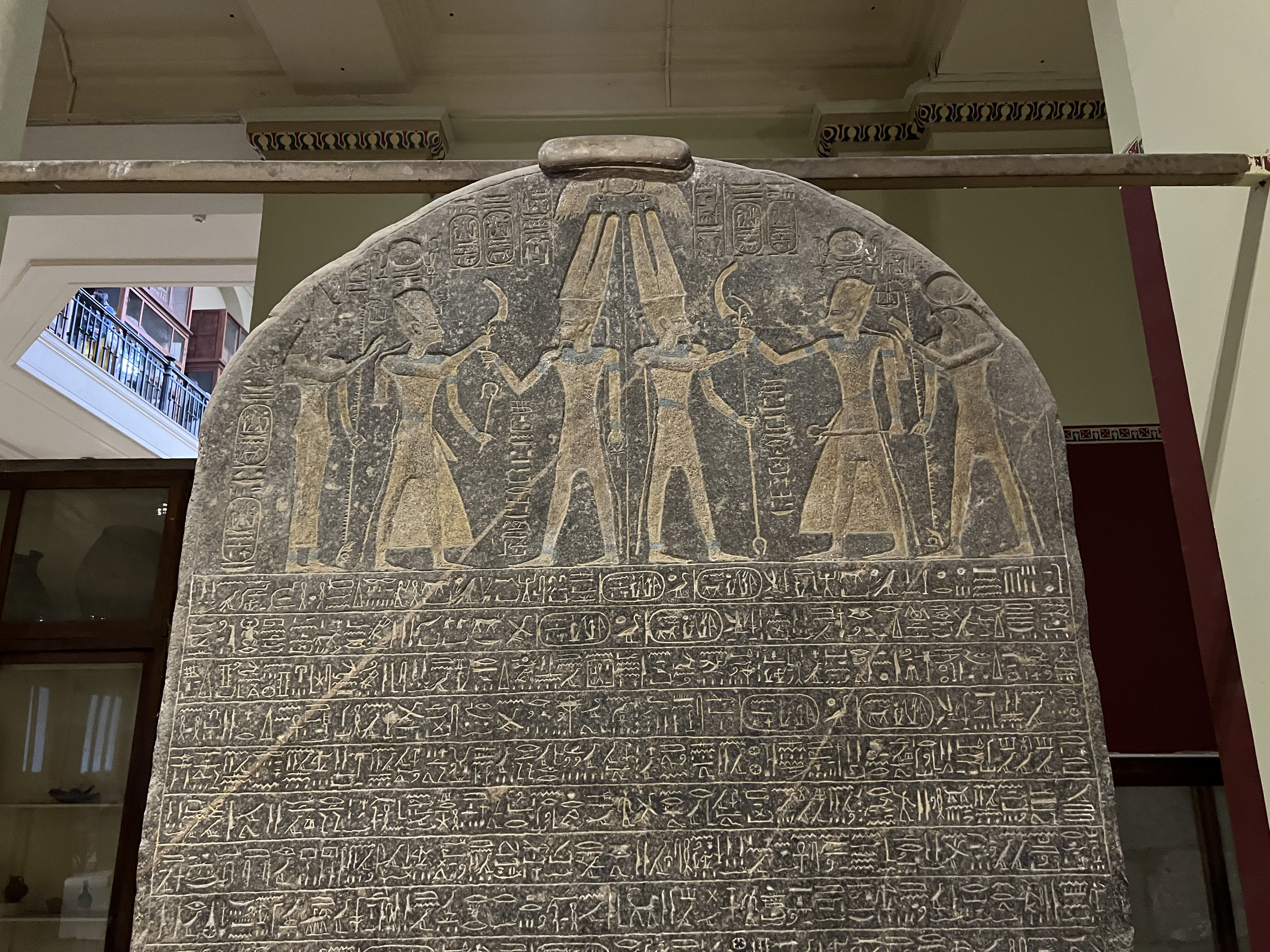
Merneptah Stele, depicting Merneptah's victory over the Libyans in 1208 BCE. Merneptah is being given a khopesh by Amun.

=== Examples in archeology ===
Archeological examples of the khopesh have been found in tombs with both dull and sharpened edges. This points to the khopesh being used as a ceremonial object as well as a weapon. Archeological examples of the khopesh are most prevalent in the New Kingdom period after their introduction during the second intermediate period.

- A bronze khopesh found in the region of Palestine was found with an engraving of Ramses II. Louvre. E 25689.
- Two examples of a khopesh were found in the tomb of King Tutankhamun. These swords were ornately carved and with a dull edge, indicating these swords were largely ceremonial in purpose. JE 61588

== See also ==
- Celurit
- Falcata – Ancient Iberian single-edged sword
- Falx – Ancient bladed weapon
- Harpe – Greek mythological weapon
- Kopis – Greek curved knife or sword
- Makraka – African hybrid knife/axe
- Shotel – Type of curved sword originating in Ethiopia

== Bibliography ==
- Massafra, Angela (2012). Le harpai nel Vicino Oriente antico. Cronologia e distribuzione. Rome La Sapienza Studies on the Archaeology of Palestine & Transjordan. Vol. 9. Rome: Università di Roma "La Sapienza", Dipartimento di Scienze dellʹAntichità, Sezione di Orientalistica. ISBN 9788888438191. OCLC 823234548.
- Wernick, Nicholas Edward (2004). "A Khepesh Sword in the University of Liverpool Museum" (PDF). The Journal of the Society for the Study of Egyptian Antiquities. 31: 151–155. ISSN 0383-9753. OCLC 17450594.
