= NDJ =

NDJ may stand for:

- N'Djamena International Airport
- ndj, an Egyptian hieroglyph
- the ISO code for Ndamba language
