= Falcata =

Ancient Iberian single-edged sword

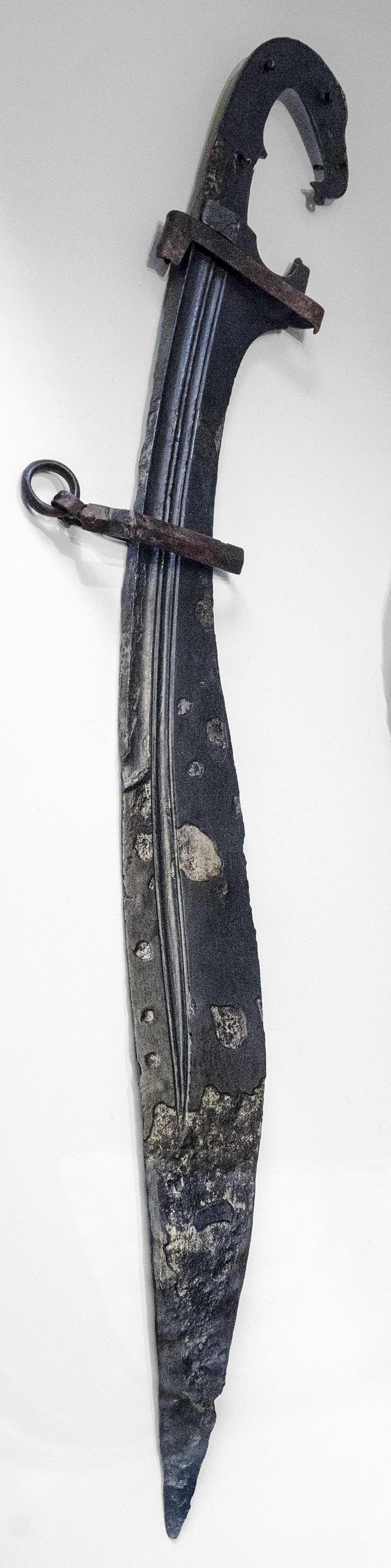
Iberian falcata

The falcata is a type of sword typical of pre-Roman Iberia. The falcata was used to great effect for warfare in the ancient Iberian Peninsula, and is firmly associated with the southern Iberian tribes, among other ancient peoples of Hispania. It was highly prized by the ancient general Hannibal, who equipped Carthaginian troops with it during the Second Punic War.

== Name ==
It is unknown which name the people of pre-Roman Hispania gave to the weapon. Falcata is neither a native name nor one used in classical sources, but a 19th century term coined by historian Fernando Fulgosio to describe the shape of its blade. The term derivates from Latin falcatus, meaning literally "falcon-shaped". Classical vocabulary did have a sword named ensis falcatus, but it was apparently meant to be either a falx or a harpe. In any case, the name caught on very quickly and is now firmly entrenched in the scholarly literature.

== Shape ==
The falcata has a single-edged blade that pitches forward towards the point, the edge being concave near the hilt, but convex near the point. This shape distributes the weight in such a way that the falcata is capable of delivering a blow with the momentum of an axe, while maintaining the longer cutting edge of a sword, as well as the facility to thrust. The grip is typically hook-shaped, the end often stylized in the shape of a horse or a bird. There is often a thin chain connecting the hooked butt of the handle with the hilt. Though almost identical to the Greek kopis, the falcata is distinguished by the sharpened false edge in the second half of its length.

== Origin ==
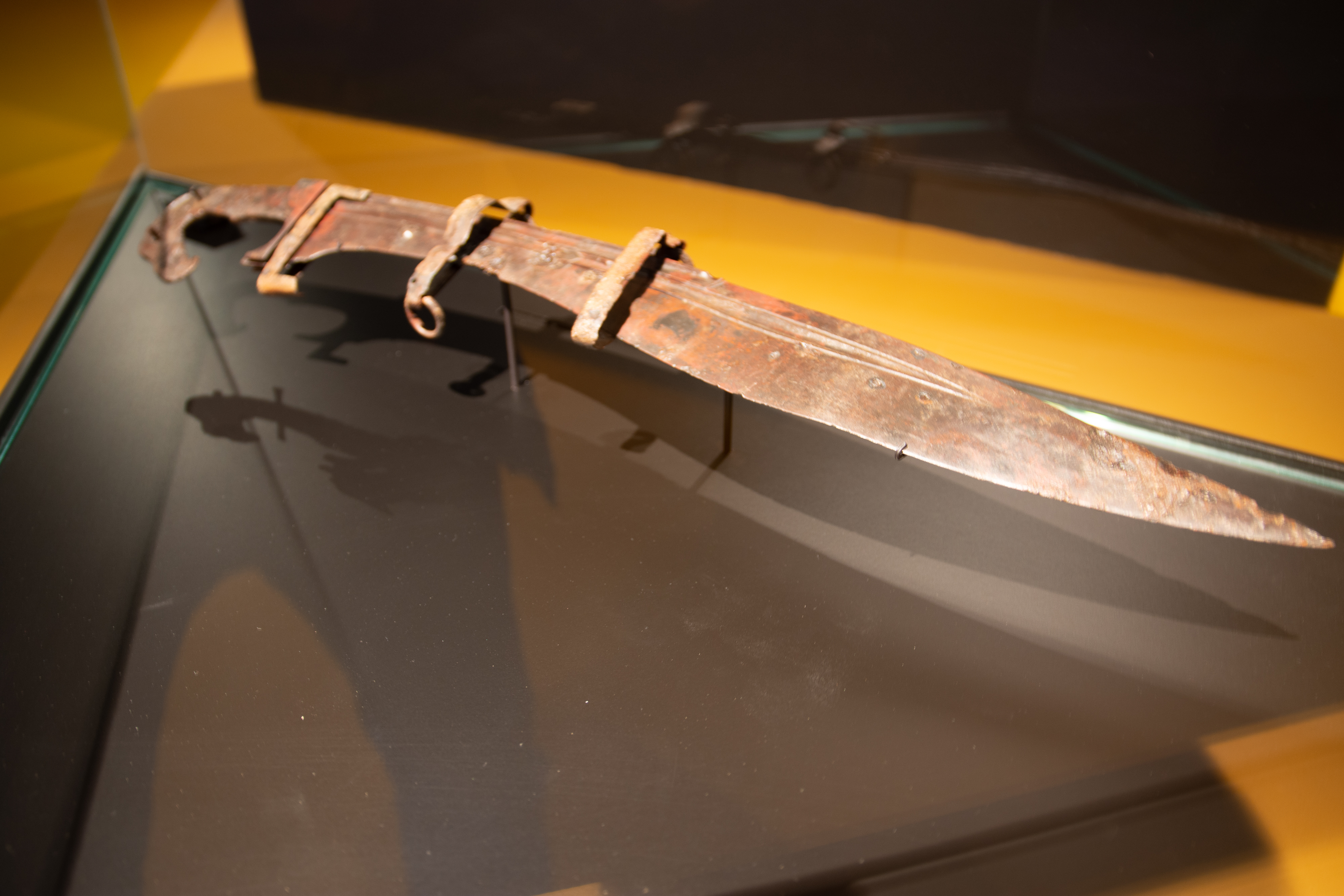
Falcata of the Necrópolis de los Collados, Almedinilla, Córdoba, Spain

Some have posited that the falcata was derived from the sickle-shaped knives of the Iron Age; which coincides with their ritual use. Some speculate it was introduced to the Iberian Peninsula by the Celts, along with iron working. There are several historians who believe that the falcata's origin is coincident to the Greek kopis without deriving from it. However, the extent of profound Hellenic influence both eastwards and westwards, as in Greek trade ports like Emporion (modern Empuries) from the 8th century BCE along the Mediterranean coast of Iberia, the unequivocal archeological record of the kopis predating the falcata by centuries, as well as the utterly anomalous inward "recurve" configuration across the entire world history of blades, all heavily argue for the Greek origin and influence.

== Quality and manufacture ==
Roman armies in the Second Punic War and later, during the Conquest of Hispania, were surprised by the quality of the weapons used by Iberian mercenaries and warriors. The overall quality of the falcata came not only from the shape, but also from the quality of the iron. It is said that steel plates were buried in the ground for two to three years, corroding the weaker steel from them, but this is technically nonsensical as the higher carbon content of the 'better' steel makes it more vulnerable to chemical corrosion. The technique of joining layers of steel in a fire-welding process in a forge was a standard procedure.

== Ornamental and liturgical uses ==
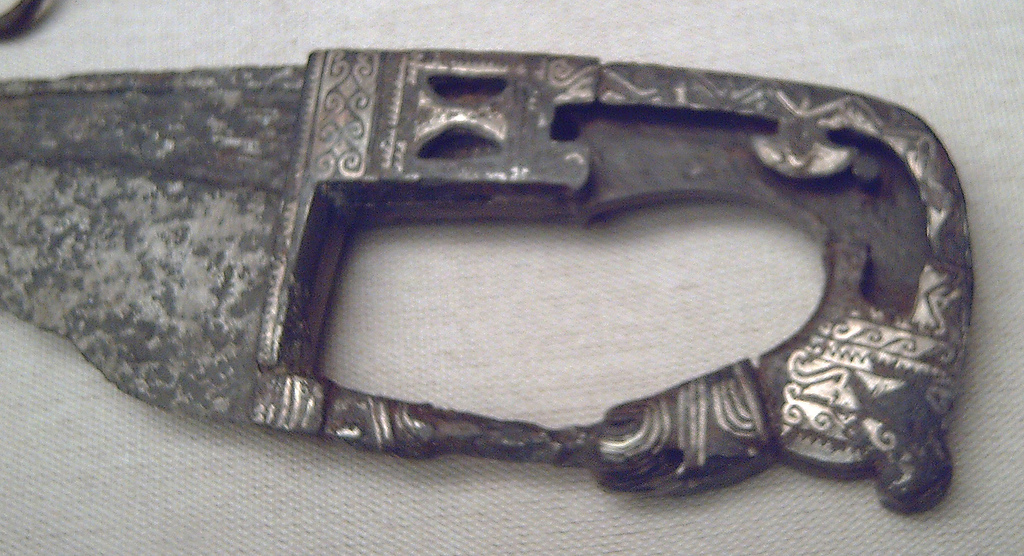
Decorated hilt of a 3rd or 4th century BC falcata from Almedinilla, Córdoba (M.A.N., Madrid).

In the early times of the tribes in Iberia, its use was more ornamental and liturgical than military. Highly decorated falcata have been found in tombs, for example the Falcata de Almedinilla. The scarcity of the falcata during early times was due to the expense and scarcity of iron in the region.

== In ancient texts ==
Since "falcata" is not a term used in Classical Latin, it is difficult to tell when, or even if, it is being referred to in ancient literature. There is, however, one passage that is generally agreed to refer to this type of sword, in Seneca's De Beneficiis 5.24:

A veteran who had been a bit too rough with his neighbors was pleading his case before Julius Caesar. "Do you remember," he said, "Imperator, remember how you twisted your ankle near Sucro?" When Caesar said he did remember: "Then you certainly remember that when you were lying to rest under a tree that was casting just a tiny shadow, in a very tough terrain with just that one lonely tree sticking out, one of your men laid out his cloak for you?"

Caesar said "Why shouldn't I remember, even if I was exhausted? Because I was unable to walk I couldn't go to the nearby spring, and I would have been willing to crawl there on hands and knees, if it were not for a good soldier, a brave industrious chap, hadn't brought me water in his helmet?" to which the man replied,

"Then, Imperator, you could recognize that man, or that helmet?" Caesar answered that he couldn't recognize the helmet, but certainly the man, and added, a bit irritated I think, "And you certainly are not him!" "It's not surprising," said the man, "that you do not recognize me, Caesar; for when that happened I was whole. Afterwards, at Munda my eye was gouged out, and my skull smashed in. Nor would you recognize that helmet if you saw it: it was split by a Hispanian sword (machaera Hispana)."

Polybius also calls Iberian swords machaera, possibly referring to the falcata given its similarities to the Greek makhaira. However, he also employs this name for the straight swords used by the Gauls and even the Romans themselves. The additional fact that other tribes from Hispania also used straight swords, which were later to inspire the Roman gladius, obscures the differentiation of their respective names.

== See also ==
- Kopis
- Makhaira
- Khopesh
- Kukri
- Machete
- Yatagan
- Oakeshott typology

== Bibliography ==
- Aranegui, C. y De Hoz, J. (1992): “Una falcata decorada con inscripción ibérica. Juegos gladiatorios y venationes”, en Homenaje a Enrique Pla Ballester, Trabajos Varios del SIP 89, 319-344
- Cuadrado Díaz, E. (1989): La panoplia ibérica de “El Cigarralejo” (Mula, Murcia). Documentos. Serie Arqueología. Murcia
- Nieto, G. y Escalera, A. (1970): “Estudio y tratamiento de una falcata de Almedinilla”, Informes y trabajos del Instituto de Restauración y Conservación, 10
- F. Quesada Sanz: "Máchaira, kopís, falcata" in Homenaje a Francisco Torrent, Madrid, 1994, pp. 75-94.
- Quesada Sanz, F. (1991): “En torno al origen y procedencia de la falcata ibérica”. In J. Remesal, O.Musso (eds.), La presencia de material etrusco en la Península Ibérica, Barcelona
- Quesada Sanz, F. (1990b): “Falcatas ibéricas con damasquinados en plata”. Homenaje a D. Emeterio Cuadrado, Verdolay, 2, 45-59
- Quesada Sanz, F. (1992a): Arma y símbolo: la falcata ibérica. Instituto de Cultura Juan Gil-Albert, Alicante
- Quesada Sanz, F. (1992b): “Notas sobre el armamento ibérico de Almedinilla”, Anales de Arqueología Cordobesa, 3, 113-136
- Quesada Sanz, F. (1997a): “Algo más que un tipo de espada: la falcata ibérica”. Catálogo de la Exposición: La guerra en la Antigüedad. Madrid, pp. 196–205
- Quesada Sanz, F. (1997b): El armamento ibérico. Estudio tipológico, geográfico, funcional, social y simbólico de las armas en la Cultura Ibérica (siglos VI-I a.C.). 2 vols. Monographies Instrumentum, 3. Ed. Monique Mergoil, Montagnac, 1997
- Quesada Sanz, F. (1998): “Armas para los muertos”. Los íberos, príncipes de Occidente Catálogo de la Exposición. Barcelona, pp. 125–31
- Quesada Sanz, Fernando (2010): "Weapons, Warriors and Battles of Ancient Iberia", Translated by Elizabeth Clowes and Pablo Stewart Harding-Vera. Pen and Sword Books (Yorkshire, Philadelphia)
