= Rhomphaia =

Ancient Thracian bladed weapon

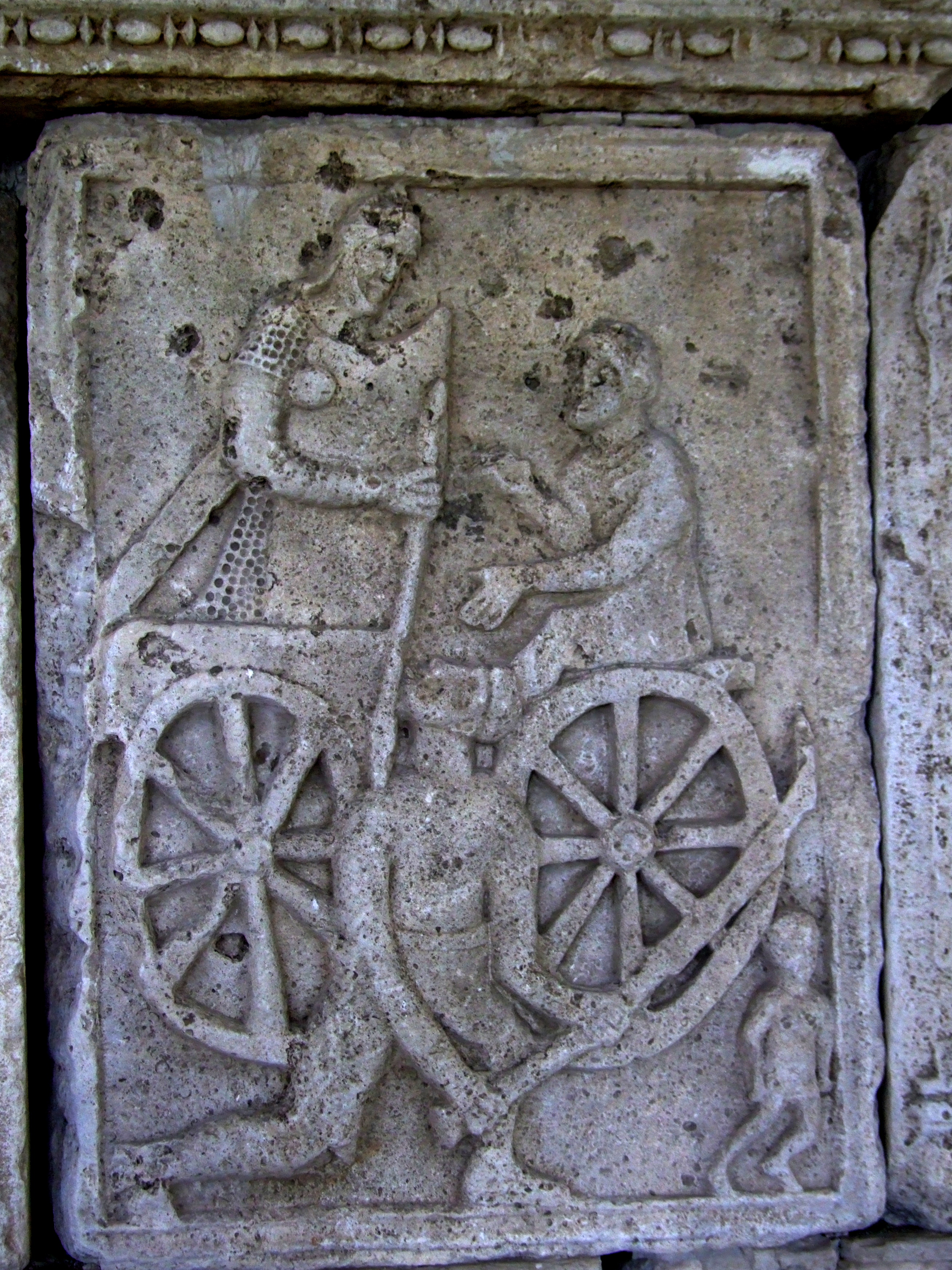
Shown on Tropaeum Traiani Metope

The rhomphaia (Ancient Greek: ῥομφαία) was a close-combat bladed weapon used by the Thracians as early as 350-400 BC. Rhomphaias were weapons with a straight or slightly curved single-edged blade. Although the rhomphaia was similar to the falx, most archaeological evidence suggests that rhomphaias were forged with straight or slightly curved blades, presumably to enable their use as both a thrusting and slashing weapon.

The blade was constructed of iron and used a triangular cross section to accommodate the single cutting edge with a tang of rectangular cross section. Length varied, but a typical rhomphaia would have a blade of approximately 60–80 cm (24–31 in) and a tang of approximately 50 cm (20 in). From the length of the tang, it can be presumed that, when attached to the hilt, this portion of the weapon would be of similar length to the blade.

== Usage ==
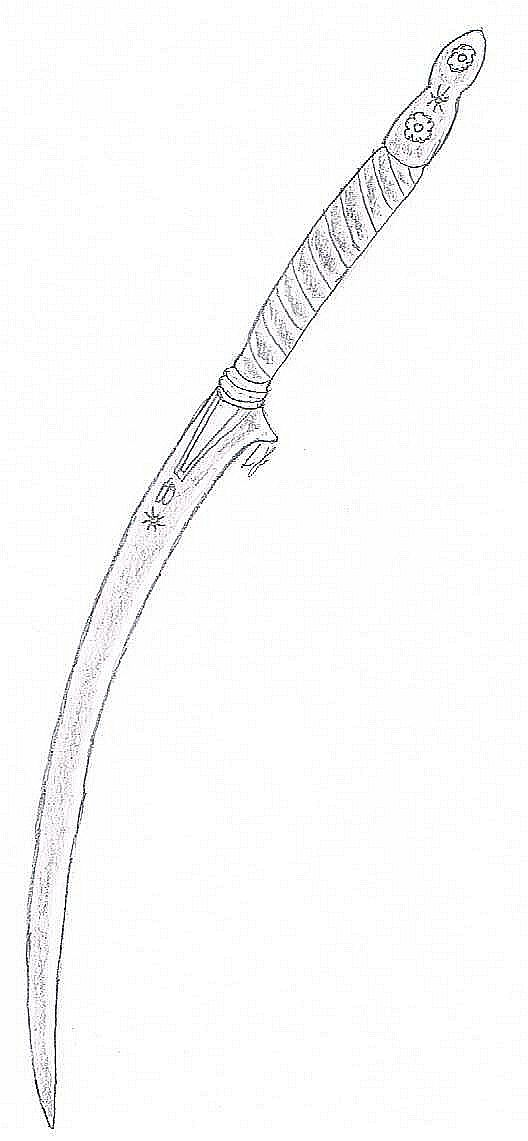
Modern reconstruction of a rhomphaia.

Used almost exclusively by the Thracians, examples have been found dating from 300-400 BC. As a weapon, the rhomphaia was feared (like the falx) because of the cutting power afforded to it by its design. The falx forced the only documented change in Roman armour brought about by an encounter with a new weapon. After encountering the falx in Dacia, the Romans added extra reinforcing bars to their helmets to protect against the powerful blows of this weapon. According to some researchers, this weapon was developed by the Bessi, who were actively involved in mining and metalworking.

== Differences from the falx ==
The rhomphaia's blade was straight or only slightly curved, while the falx's blade was significantly curved. Because its straighter blade facilitated a thrusting motion, as well as an overhead or sidewards hacking motion, the rhomphaia could be used by tightly packed troops as a defensive weapon. However, the straighter blade limited the use of the cutting edge.

== Rhomphaia in historical texts ==
=== Roman ===
Rhomphaia was first a "spear", later a "sword" (Plutarch: Life of Aemilius Paulus 18; Eustathius, on Iliad verse VI 166; Hesychius; also Luke 2:35 and the Revelation of John of Patmos, several times.). In Latin, it has the forms:

- rumpia (Livy, Aulus Gellius, Ascon. ad Mil.)
- romphea (Isidore of Seville.),
- romphaea vel romfea (CGL 7, 212).

The Thracian rhomphaia contains the stem *rump- in the Latin rumpo, -ere "to break, to tear".

=== Byzantine ===
A weapon called rhomphaia was also mentioned in Michael Psellos' Chronographia where he describes it as a "one-edged sword of heavy iron which they [the palace guards at Constantinople] carry suspended from the right shoulder". This was possibly a reference to the Varangian Guard and their two handed axe, probably a Dane axe. However, Niketas Choniates describes the bodyguards of the emperor Andronikos I Komnenos as removing "the two-edged swords from their shoulders". Being two-edged, these weapons do not resemble Dane axes.

It is also mentioned in Anna Komnene's Alexiad. She explains that during the battle, her father, Alexios I Komnenos, fought against the rebel Nikephoros Bryennios the Elder. Alexius happened upon a horse saddled for an emperor, which also had a number of grooms, some of whom "had in their hands the great iron swords which normally accompany the emperors". They seem to have been very distinctive for the Byzantines who, after an initial rout, saw "the general display of the royal horse with its insignia and the sight of the great swords (which all but spoke for themselves) convinced them that the news was true: Bryennius, who was guarded by these swords, had fallen into the hands of his enemies".

=== New Testament ===
The word 'rhomphaia' is preserved in modern Greek, with the meaning of "big broad sword". It is mentioned in the New Testament in the Gospel of Luke 2,34-35: "And Simeon blessed them, and he said to his mother Mary: "Behold, this one has been set for the ruin and for the resurrection of many in Israel, and as a sign which will be contradicted. And a sword will pass through your own soul, so that the thoughts of many hearts may be revealed." In the Greek original "And a sword will pass through your own soul" is "καὶ σοῦ [δὲ] αὐτῆς τὴν ψυχὴν διελεύσεται ῥομφαία".

=== Trivia ===
W. Tomaschek listed the Bulgarian roféja, rufja (руфя), i.e. "thunderbolt" and the Albanian rrufeja as derivatives of that word. In Albanian folk beliefs the lightning was regarded as the "fire of the sky" (zjarri i qiellit) and was considered the "weapon of the deity" (arma/pushka e perëndisë), indeed an Albanian word to refer to the lightning is rrufeja, related to the Thracian rhomphaia.

== See also ==
- Falx
- Dadao
- Zhanmadao
- Nagamaki

== Bibliography ==
- Choniates, N.: Magoulias, Harry J., ed. (1984). O City of Byzantium. Annals of Niketas Choniates. Detroit: Wayne State University Press. ISBN 0-8143-1764-2.
- Tirta, Mark (2004). Petrit Bezhan (ed.). Mitologjia ndër shqiptarë (in Albanian). Tirana: Mësonjëtorja. ISBN 99927-938-9-9.
