= Siege hook =

Piece of siege equipment

A siege hook is a weapon used to pull stones from a wall during a siege. The method used was to penetrate the protective wall with the hook and then retract it, pulling away some of the wall with it.

The Greek historian Polybius, in his Histories, mentions the use of such weapons at the Roman siege of Ambracia:

The Aetolians being besieged by the consul Marcus Fulvius, offered a gallant resistance [...] as the rams vigorously battered the walls, and the long poles with their iron sickles tore off the battlements, they tried to invent machines to baffle them, letting down huge masses of lead and stones and oak logs by means of levers upon the battering rams; and putting iron hooks upon the sickles and hauling them inside the walls, so that the poles to which they were fastened broke against the battlements, and the sickles fell into their hands.

== See also ==
- Falx
