= Falx =

Ancient bladed weapon

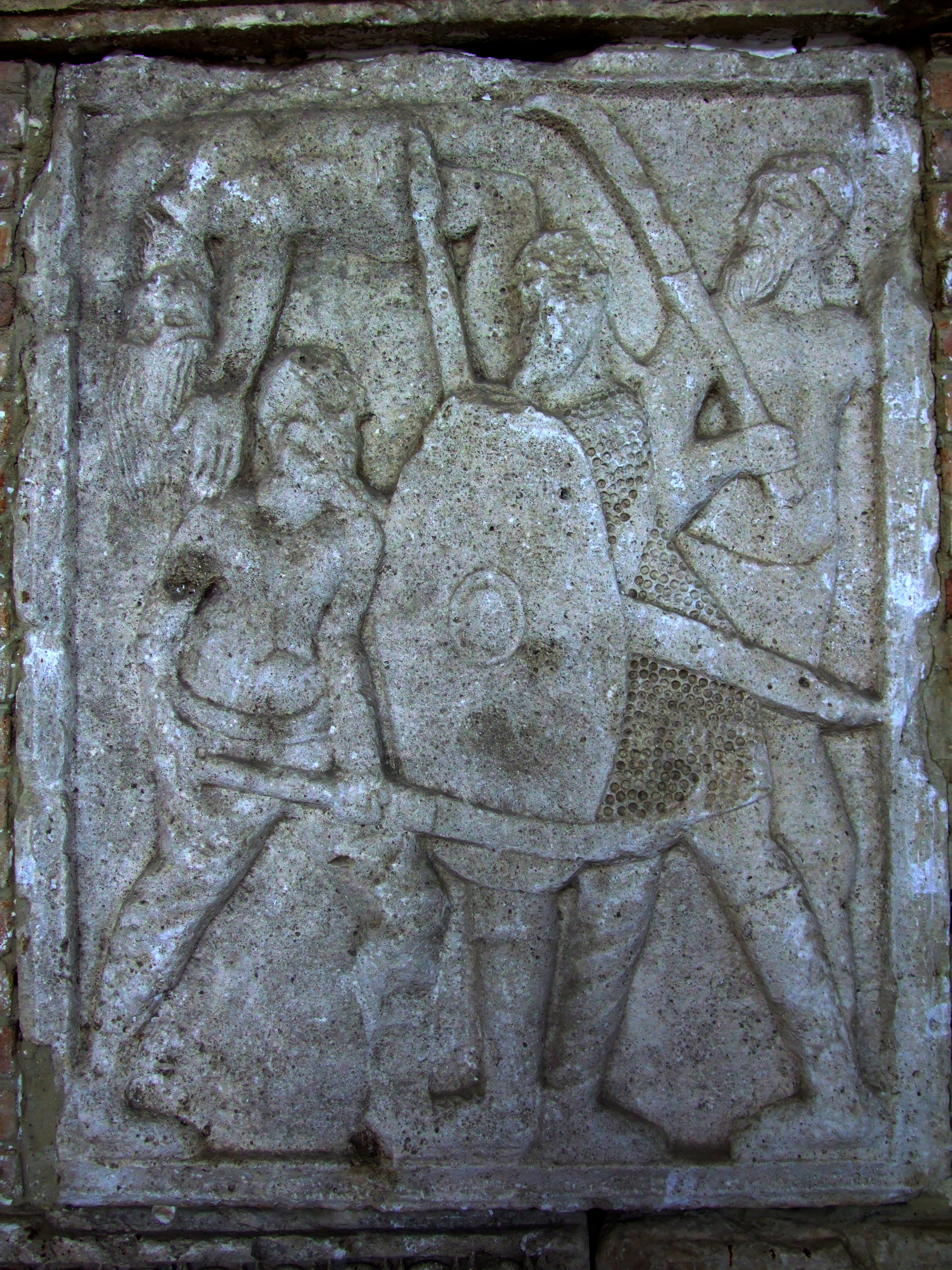
Dacian warriors wielding a two-handed falx on the Tropaeum Traiani

The falx was a weapon with a curved blade that was sharp on the inside edge used by the Thracians and Dacians. The name was later applied to a siege hook used by the Romans.

== Etymology ==
Falx is a Latin word originally meaning 'sickle' but was later used to mean any of a number of tools that had a curved blade that was sharp on the inside edge like a sickle. Falx was thus also used to mean the weapon of the Thracians and Dacians, and the Roman siege hook.

== Dacian falx ==
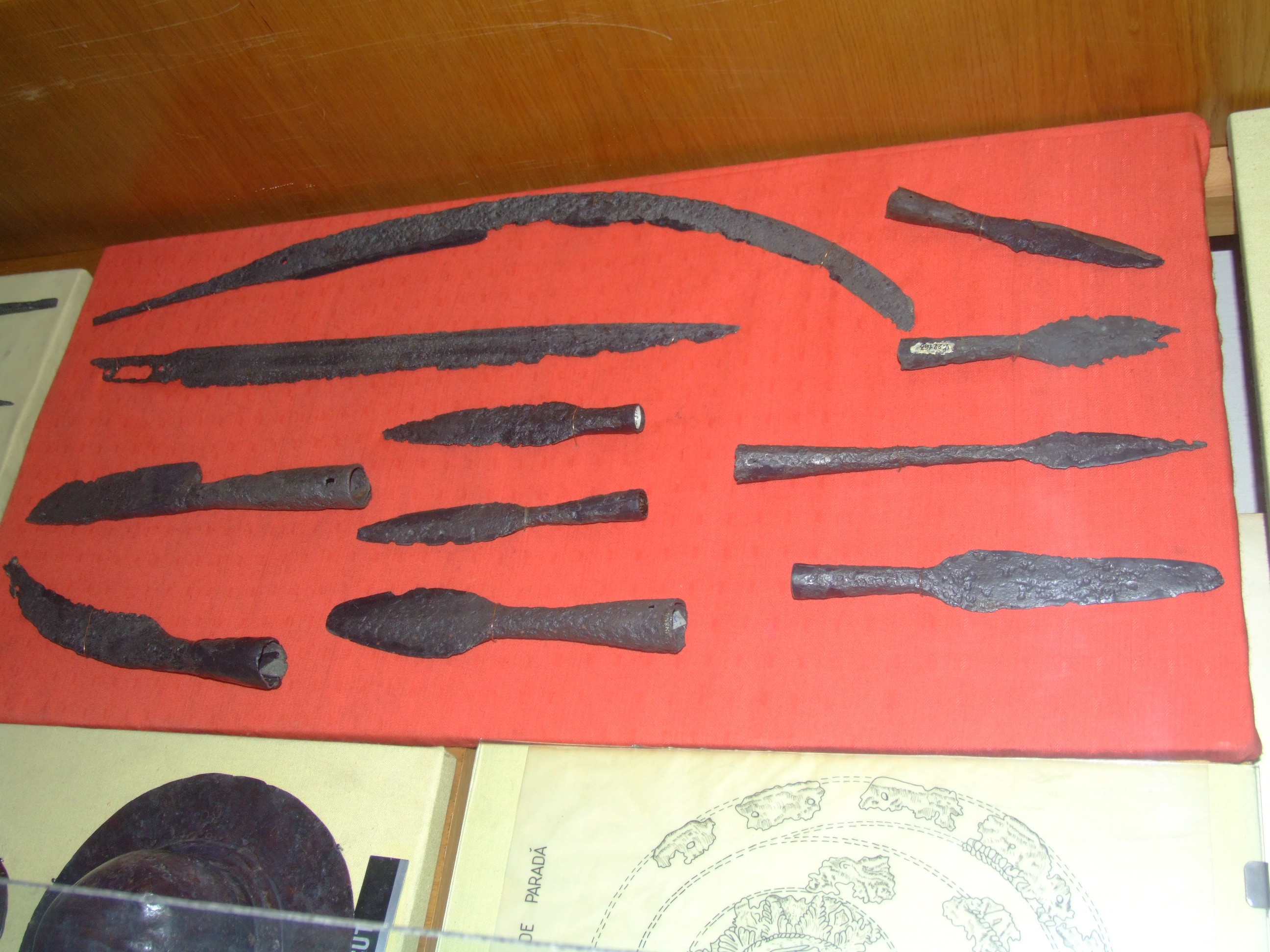
Dacian weaponry including a falx (top) exhibited in Cluj National History Museum

In Latin texts, the weapon was described as an ensis falcatus (whence falcata) by Ovid in Metamorphose and as a falx supina by Juvenal in Satiriae.

The Dacian falx came in two sizes: one-handed and two-handed. The shorter variant was called sica (sickle) in the Dacian language (Valerius Maximus, III, 2.12) with a blade length that varied but was usually around 16 inches (41 cm) long with a handle one-third longer than the blade. The two-handed falx was a polearm. It consisted of a 3-foot-long (0.91 m) wooden shaft with a long curved iron blade of nearly-equal length attached to the end. Archaeological evidence indicates that the one-handed falx was also used two-handed.

The blade was sharpened only on the inside and was reputed to be devastatingly effective. However, it left its user vulnerable because, being a two-handed weapon, the warrior could not also make use of a shield. It may be imagined that the length of the two-handed falx allowed it to be wielded with great force, the point piercing helmets and the blade splitting shields – it was said to be capable of splitting a shield in two at a single blow. Alternatively, it might have been used as a hook, pulling away shields and cutting at vulnerable limbs, or striking the edge of a strong shield. The inward curving point was still able to pierce the armour or flesh of the target behind the shield, rendering even the most reinforced shields much less effective against a falx wielder.

Trajan's Column is a monument to the emperor's conquest of Dacia. The massive base is covered with reliefs of trophies of Dacian weapons and includes several illustrations of the two-handed falx. The column itself has a helical frieze that tells the story of the Dacian wars. On the frieze, almost all the Dacians that are armed have shields and therefore cannot be using two-handed falx. The exact weapon of those few shown without shields cannot be determined with certainty. The frieze of Trajan's Column also shows Dacians using smaller, sword-sized falx. However, this column is also largely stylized, with the sculptor believed to have worked from Trajan's now lost commentary and unlikely to have witnessed the events himself. A further problem is that most of the weapons on the monument were made of metal, which have since disappeared.

The Tropaeum Traiani monument near Adamclisi, built by Trajan to commemorate the Romans who lost their lives in the Dacian counterattack in Moesia, is thought to have been constructed by the soldiers who fought there, so it may be more accurate. This column shows four distinct types of falx, whereas Trajan's shows only one type that does not resemble any on the Adamclisi monument. Because of this, historians disagree on which depiction is correct, but it has been pointed out that if the Trajan's Column falx are correct, then there would have been no need to modify Roman armour. Both columns show the Dacians fighting with no armour apart from a shield, although some on the Adamclisi monument are wearing helmets. Some historians believe that armour was not depicted to differentiate Dacians from Romans, as both used the same style of shield. Other sources indicate that Dacians by this time had undergone Romanisation, used Roman military tactics, and sometimes wore Roman-style scale armour. It is likely that the nobles at least wore armour and, combined with the falx, the Dacians would have been a formidable threat.

=== Effectiveness ===
Marcus Cornelius Fronto described the large gaping wounds that a falx inflicted, and experiments have shown that a blow from a falx easily penetrated the Romans' lorica segmentata, enough to incapacitate or kill a majority of opponents. These experiments also show that the falx was most efficient when targeting the head, shoulders, legs and especially the right (sword) arm, which was generally exposed. A legionary who had lost the use of his right arm became a serious liability to his unit in battle.

During Trajan's Dacian Wars, the Roman army adapted personal equipment while on campaign, and it seems likely that this was a response to this deadly weapon. Roman legionaries had transverse reinforcing iron straps applied to their helmets - it is clear that these are late modifications because they are roughly applied across existing embossed decoration. The legions also reintroduced the wearing of lorica hamata and lorica squamata for the Dacia campaign as both were more flexible than the newer segmentata armour which was able to distribute damage more widely. In addition, both these older armour styles had unique modifications, a row of pteruges was added to the sleeves, a double row of pteruges was added to the skirt and a heavily padded vestment was worn underneath them. Roman armour of the time left limbs unprotected; Trajan introduced the use of greaves and an arm protector (manica) for the right arm, which had previously been used only by gladiators, and which was never used again by soldiers once the Dacia campaign concluded.

== Thracian falx ==
The Thracians also made use of the falx. They also used the rhomphaia, a weapon very similar to the two-handed falx but less curved.

== Development ==
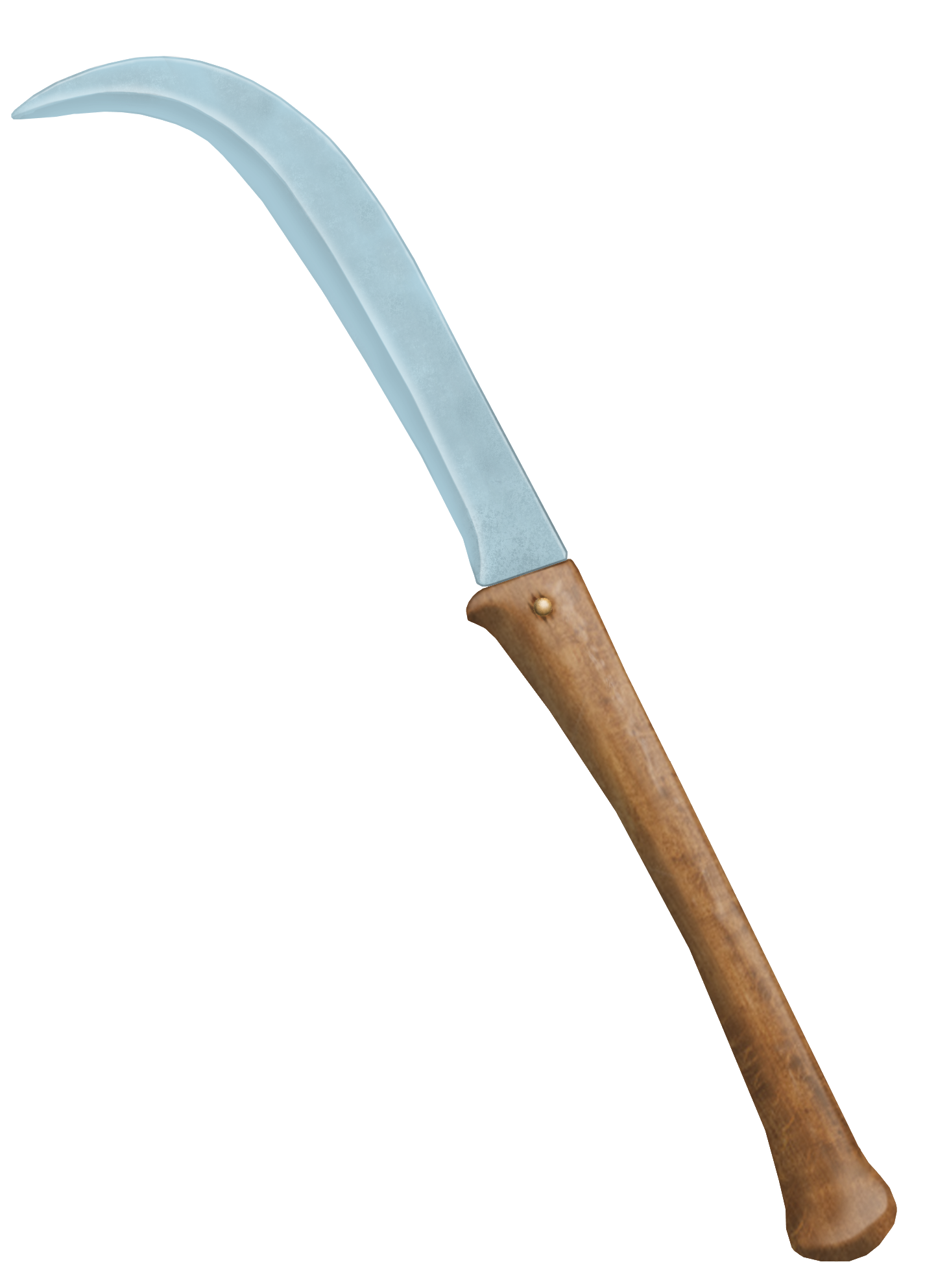
Falx, drawing based on the Adamclisi monument

The two-handed falx is clearly related to the Thracian rhomphaia. It is a derivative of both the sword and the spear, having evolved from a spear to a polearm before becoming more dramatically curved to facilitate a superior cutting action. This drastic curve rendered the falx a purely offensive weapon to be used against a broken or routing force. Typically, an enemy would be broken by a sustained hail of missile fire from javelin, dart, bow, sling, and stone throwing troops before being chased down and cut to pieces by the falx wielders.

The ancestor of the two-handed falx may have been a farming implement used as an improvised weapon, in a manner analogous to the bill-guisarme. The single-handed falx might have been inspired by the sickle, although agricultural sickles of the time were typically quite small – no more than 30 cm or so in length.

At the time of the Dacian wars, producing a long, sharp blade was technically challenging. As such, it might be that the larger two-handed falx was a high-status weapon and used only by the best warriors.

== Other variations ==
Similarly, there are the sica and the rhomphaia. The sica is a much smaller variation, some with very dramatic curves or bends. The rhomphaia is often larger and used with two hands, though there were some one-handed ones.

== Gallery ==
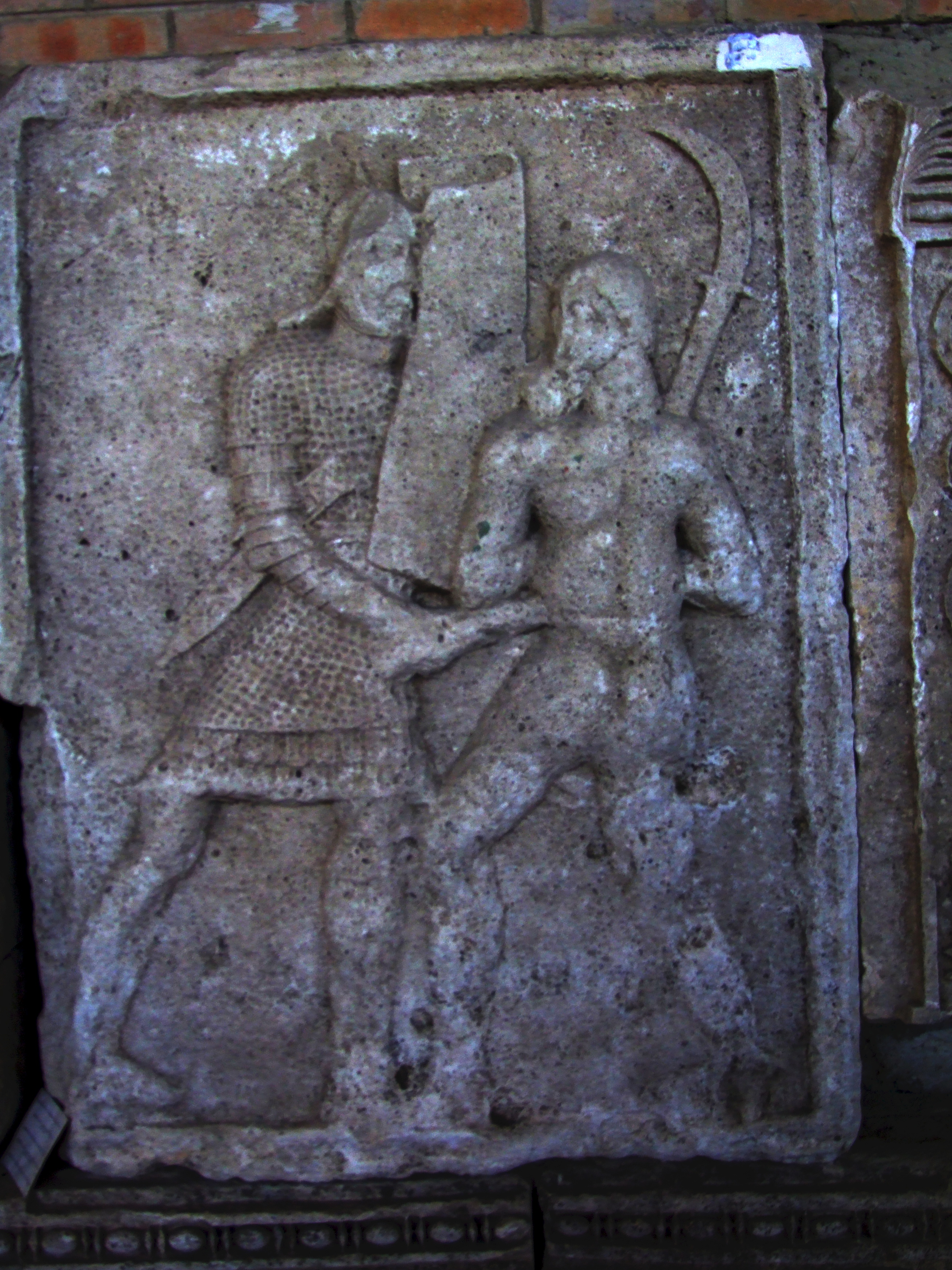
A falx (romphaia) wielded on the Tropaeum Traiani

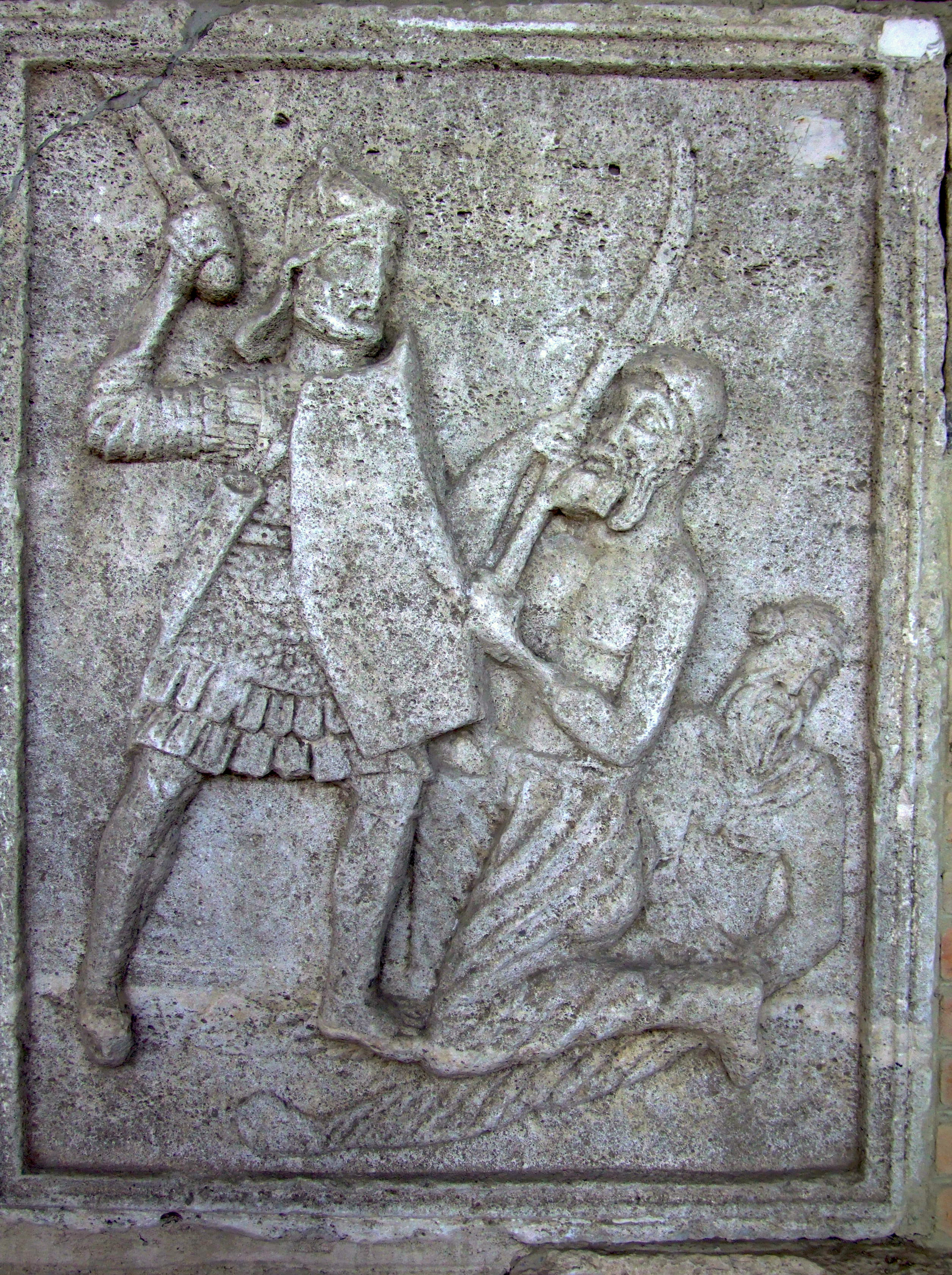
Another image from the Tropaeum Traiani

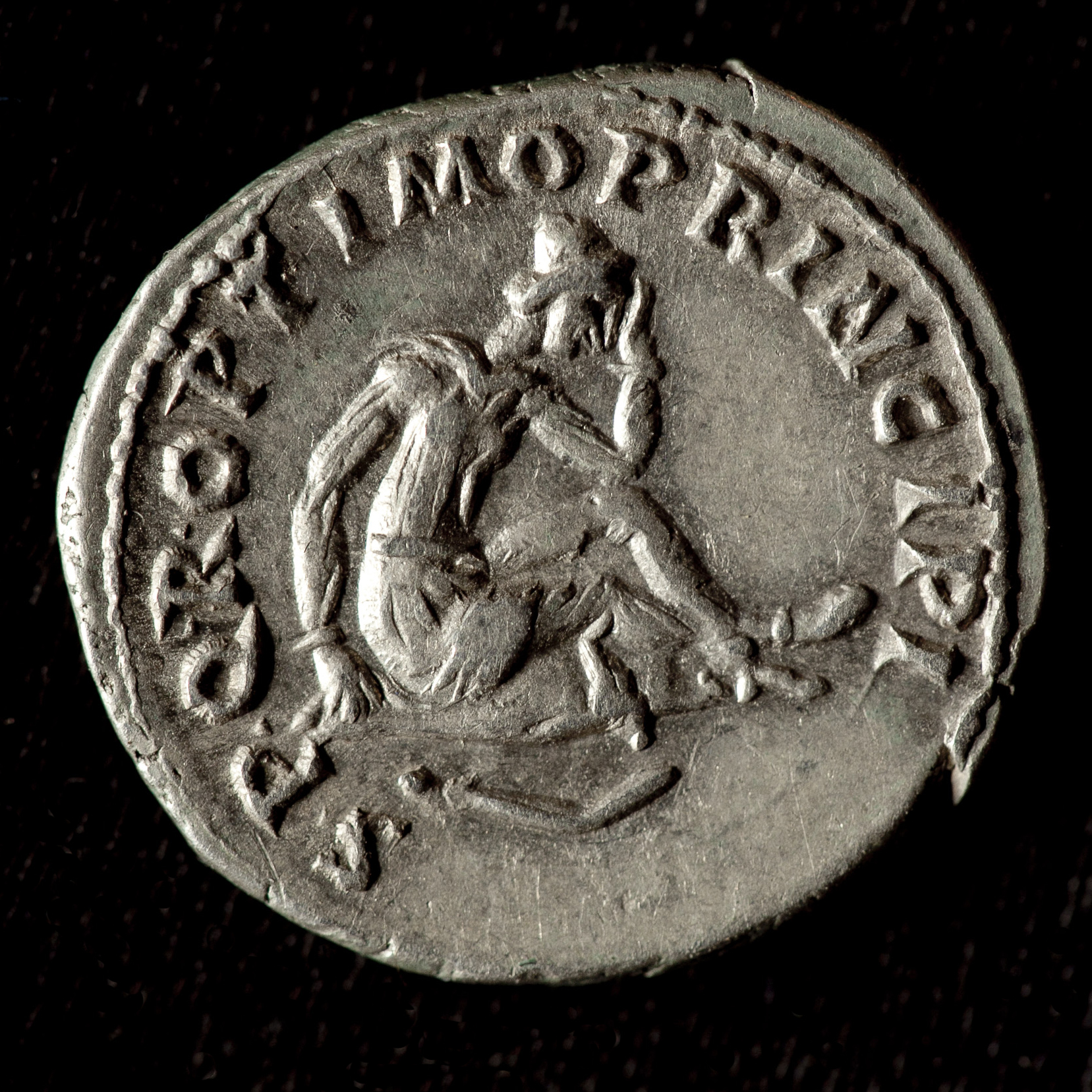
Dacian with falx (below) on reverse of a denarius (107 AD) marking the conquest of Dacia

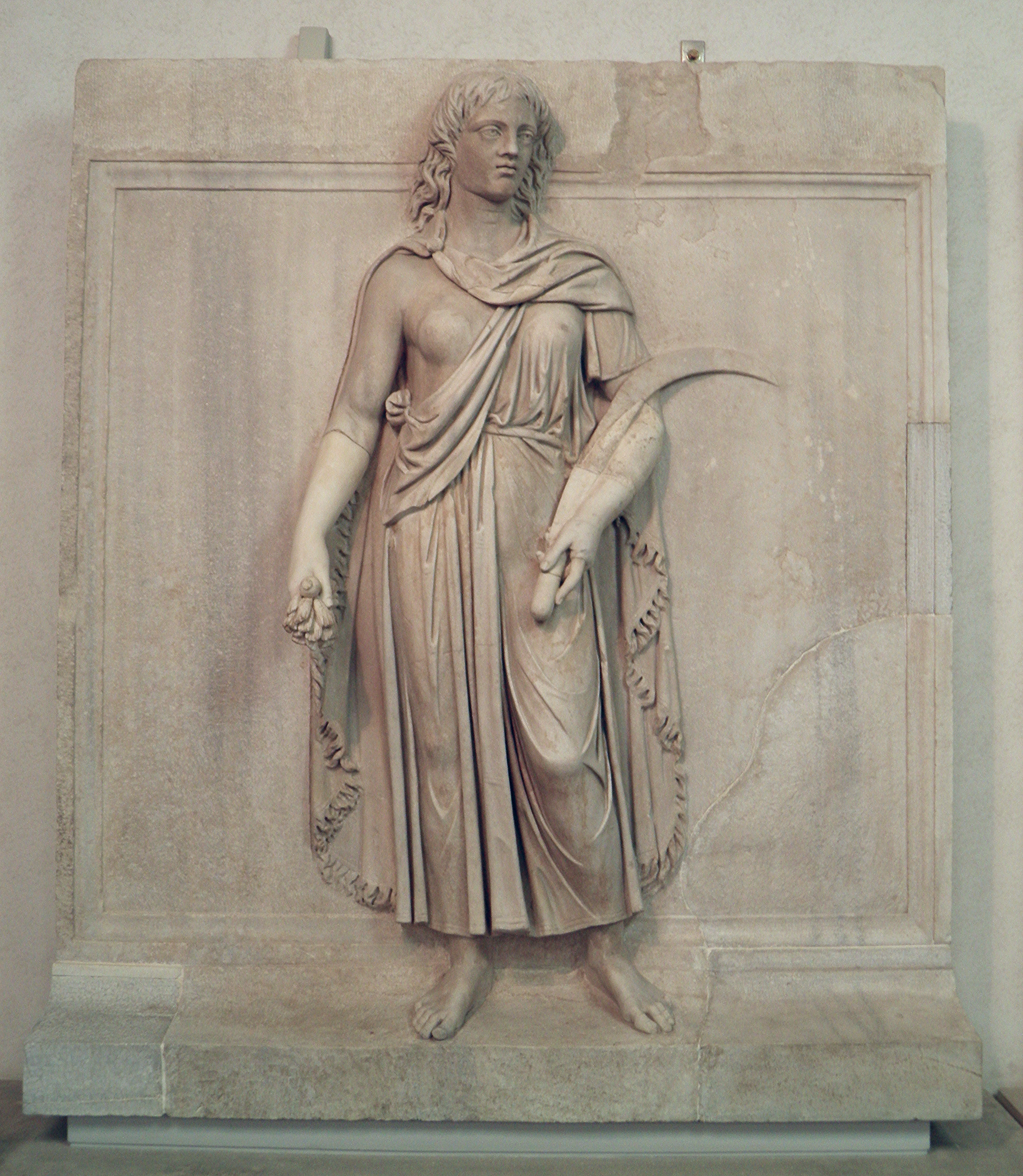
Falx with personification of a Roman province, possibly Thrace, from the Hadrianeum

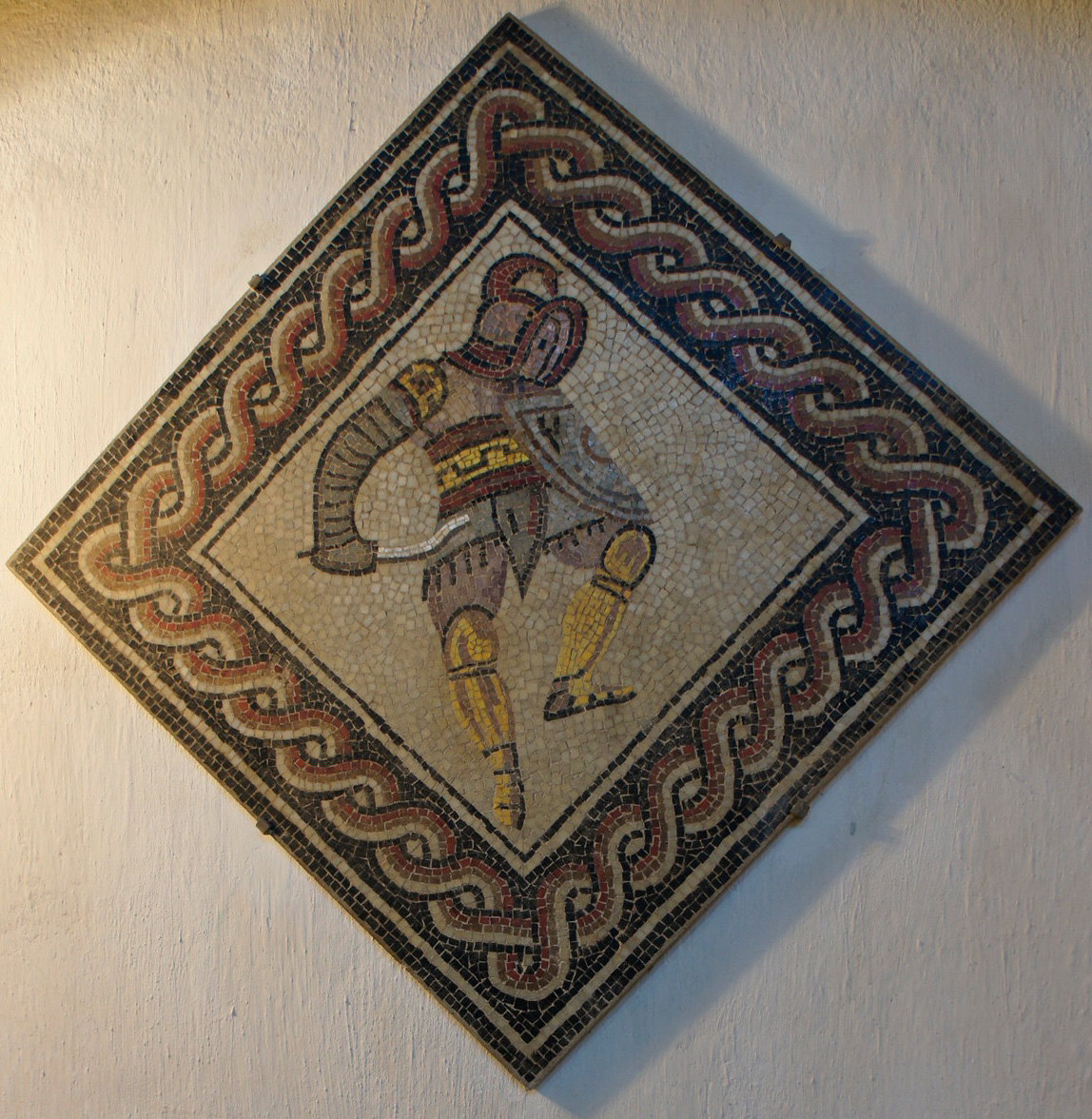
The shorter sica as the weapon of the Thraex gladiator (Gallo-Roman mosaic, 1st century)

== See also ==
- Dacian warfare
- Dadao
- Falcata
- Khopesh
- Kopis
- Scythe sword
- Siege hook
- Shotel
- Harpe
- Hook sword
- Aruval
