= Xiphos =

Ancient Greek shortsword

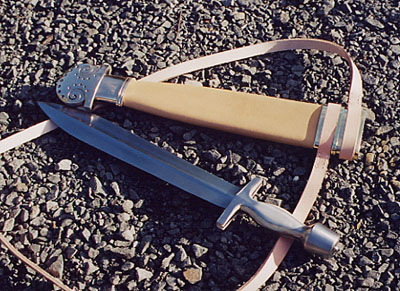
Modern reconstruction of a Greek xiphos and scabbard.

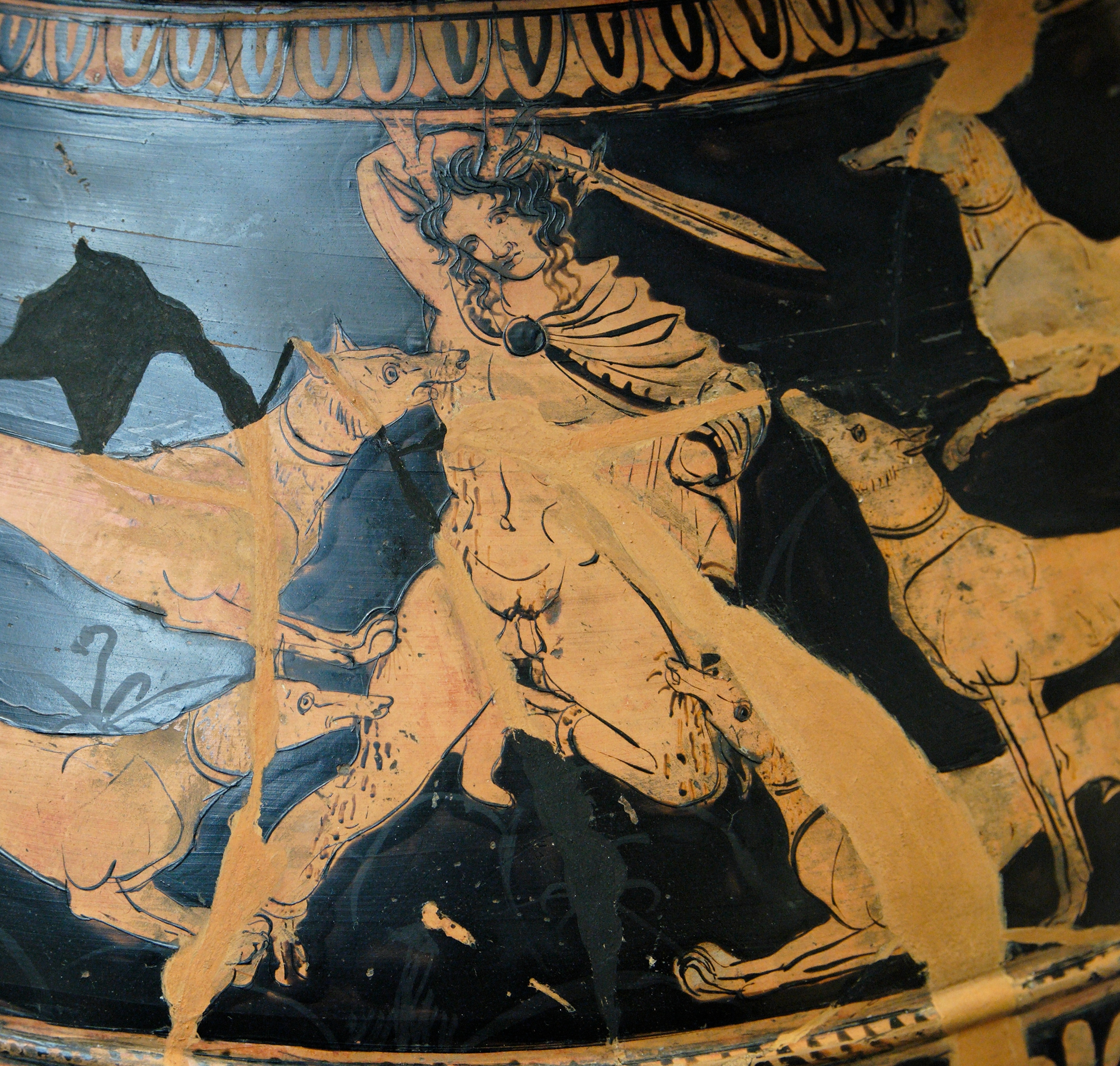
Actaeon holding a xiphos. Painted vase from Metaponto, c. 390–380 BC

The xiphos (Ancient Greek: ξίφος [ksípʰos]; plural xiphe, Ancient Greek: ξίφη [ksípʰɛː]) is a double-edged, one-handed Iron Age straight shortsword used by the ancient Greeks. It was a secondary battlefield weapon for the Greek armies after the dory or javelin. The classic blade was generally about 45–60 cm (18–24 in) long, although the Spartans supposedly preferred to use blades as short as 30 cm (12 in) around the era of the Greco-Persian Wars.

== Etymology ==
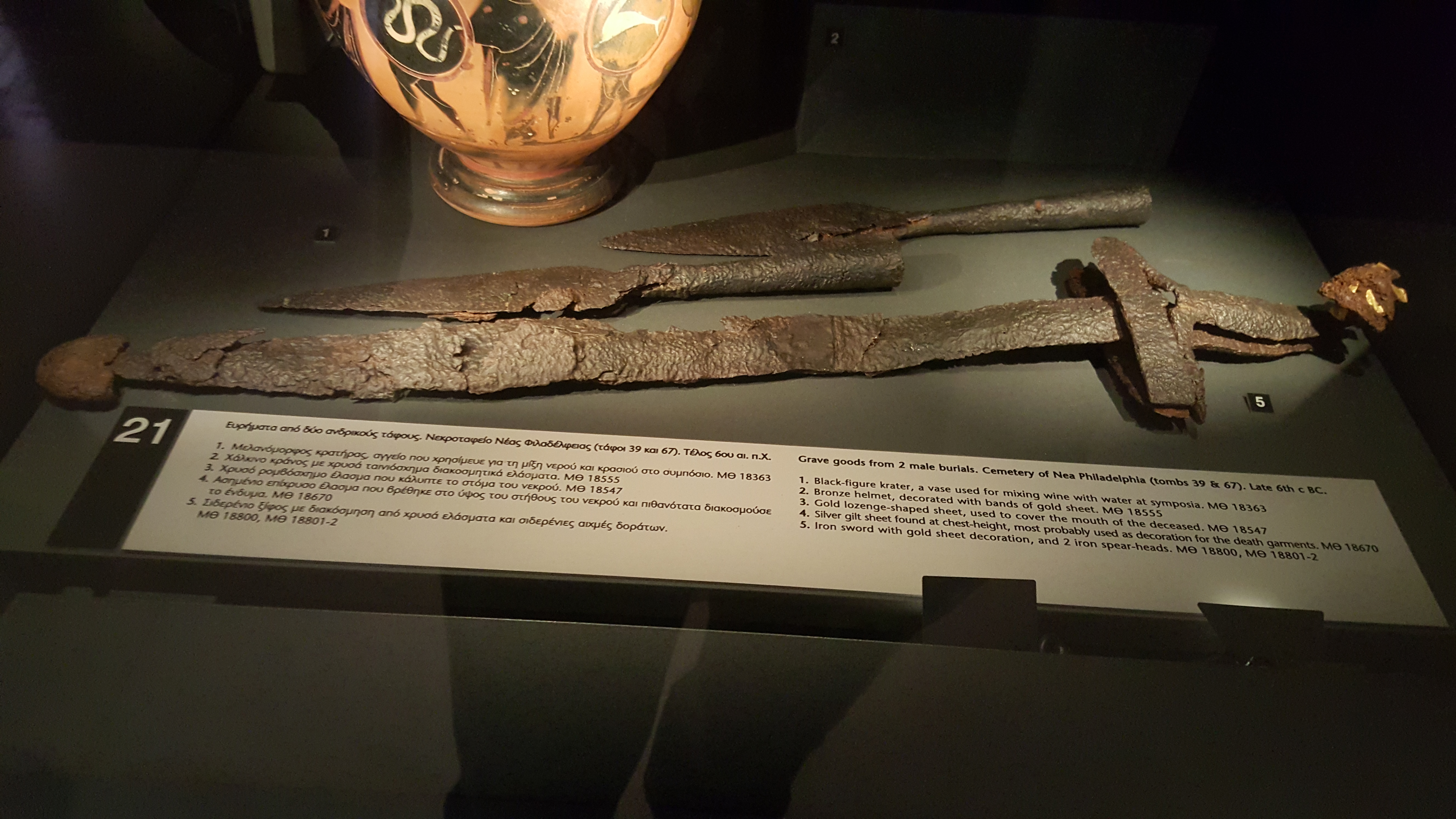
Iron xiphos, Thessaloniki museum

Stone's Glossary has xiphos being a name used by Homer for a sword. The entry in the book says that the sword had a double-edged blade widest at about two-thirds of its length from the point, and ending in a very long point.

The word is attested in Mycenaean Greek Linear B form as 𐀥𐀯𐀟𐀁, qi-si-pe-e. (Note: Qi-si-pe-e is thought to be the dual number nominative case form of *qi-si-po; that is, its meaning is "two swords". It is found on the PY Ta 716 tablet. Mycenaean 𐀞𐀏𐀙, pa-ka-na, could be an attested form of φάσγανον, phasganon, the famous Homeric word for sword. A sword is usually represented iconographically in Linear B by the ideogram 𐃉.) A relation to Arabic saifun ('a sword') and Egyptian sēfet has been suggested, although this does not explain the presence of a labiovelar in Mycenaean. One suggestion connects Ossetic äxsirf "sickle", which would point to a virtual Indo-European *kʷsibʰro-.

== Construction ==
Most xiphe handles followed a two-piece construction (similar to a knife) using either native woods or, for more exotic imports, ebony and animal bone. The two slabs were attached to the tang of the sword, secured via two or three pins and then made smooth via filing giving the characteristic oval shape of a xiphos grip. Hand guards usually followed a "bridge" shape and were either also of organic material or iron or a combination of both, also secured via pins on each point. Some swords found in Italy or Macedonia tended to have an iron extension/reinforcement running along the handle.

There have been finds of xiphe with hilts decorated with gold foil. These swords were most likely ceremonial since they are always found in burial sites.

Surviving xiphe are relatively rare, but appear alongside iron weapons in burial sites, indicating both a household status and continued use into the Iron Age.

== History ==
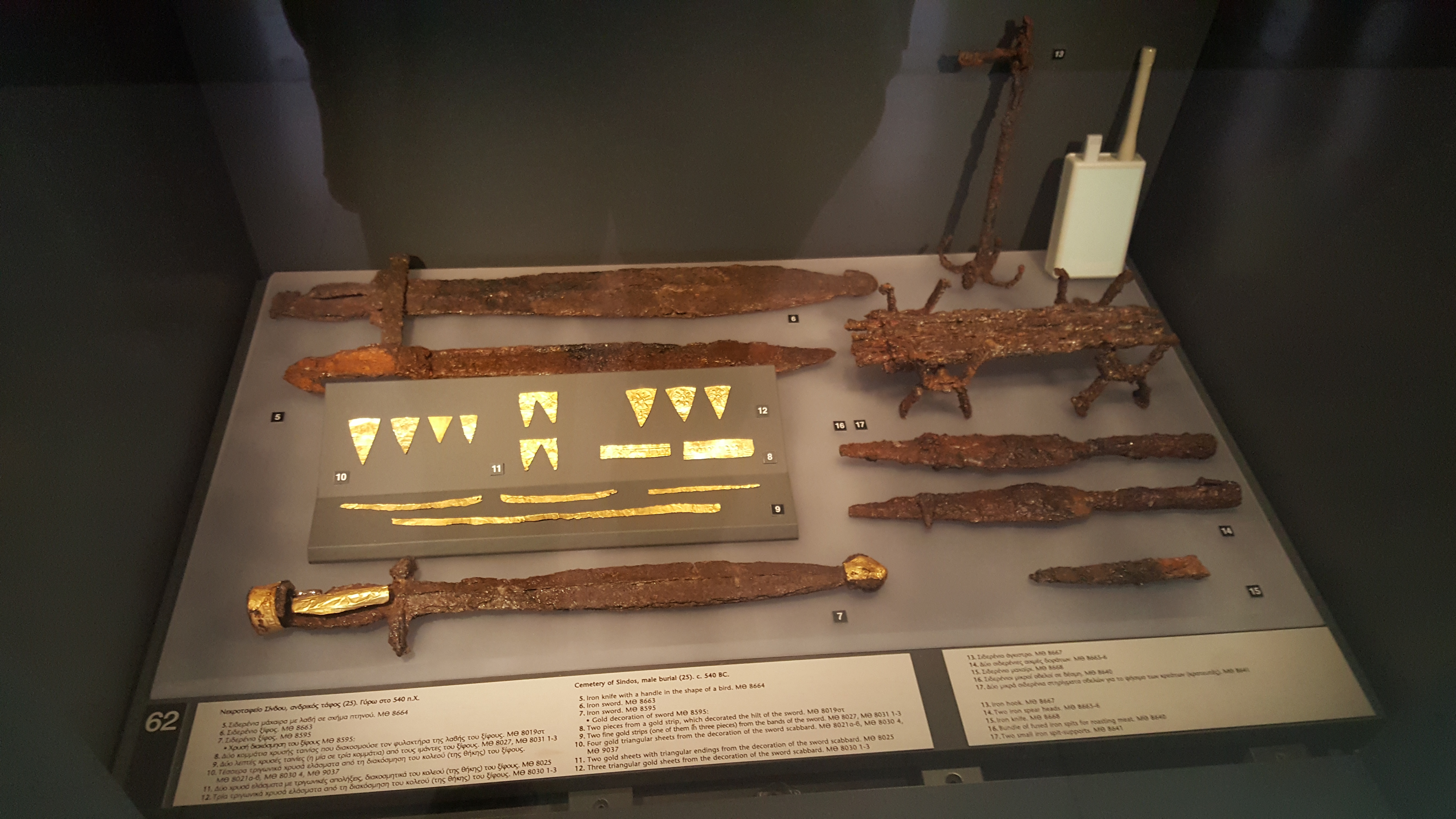
Iron xiphos, kopis and iron spear heads, Thessaloniki Museum

The period between the Classical and Iron Ages is often referred to as a "dark age", but it featured important developments and innovations in metal casting, alloy construction, and procurement as widespread use of metallurgy slowly spread out of Iberia.

The xiphos sometimes has a midrib, and is diamond or lenticular in cross-section. It was a rather light weapon, with a weight around 450–900 g (0.99–1.98 lb). It was generally hung from a baldric under the left arm. The xiphos was generally used only when the spear was broken, taken by the enemy, or discarded for close combat. Very few xiphe are known to have survived.

The xiphos's leaf-shaped design lent itself to both cutting and thrusting. The origin of the design goes back to the Bronze Age; the blade of the xiphos looks almost identical to the blade of the Mycenaean Naue II sword, which itself transitioned from having a blade of bronze into a blade of iron during the Archaic period. It is likely that the xiphos is the natural evolution of the iron version of the Naue II but with a more sophisticated handle design.

The leaf-shaped short swords were not limited to Greece, as mentioned, but can be found throughout Europe in the late Bronze Age under various names.

The early Celtic La Tène short sword, contemporary with the xiphos, had a virtually identical blade design as the xiphos.

== See also ==
- Gladius
- Iron Age sword
- Kopis
- Makhaira

== Notes and references ==
Notes
