= Epsilon axe =

Type of battle axe

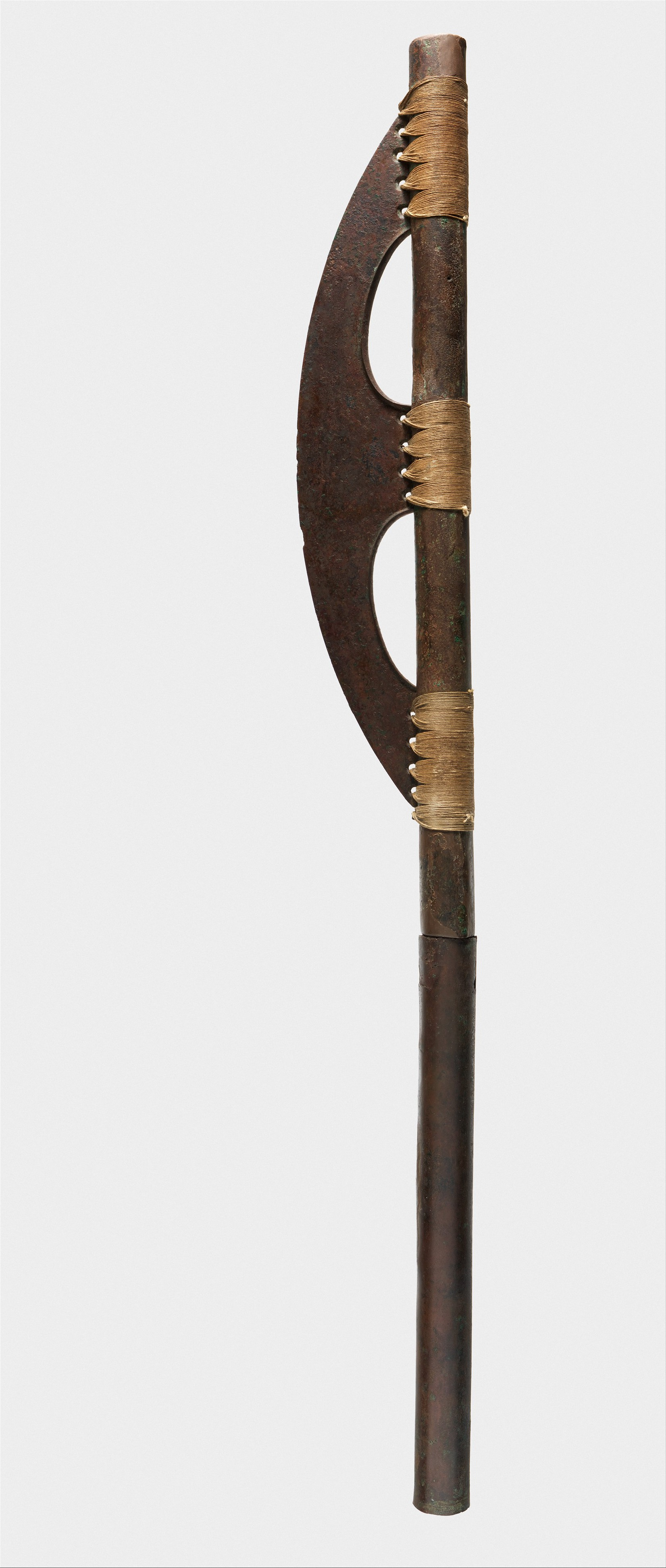
Egyptian epsilon axe (restored shaft and lashing), 19th century BC, bronze, Metropolitan Museum of Art.

The epsilon axe is a type of battle axe named for its similarity to the Greek letter epsilon (ϵ). The epsilon axe was widely used throughout the Middle East, its usage spread from there and grew in popularity to be used in eastern Europe and Russia as well as the Nordic countries. The axe is also depicted in Egyptian hieroglyphs with the warrior carrying both the epsilon axe and a shield thus leaving some to believe that this weapon was used also as a one handed weapon. Bronze examples of the Assyrian design are kept in the British Museum. Some historians have called the epsilon axe the "poor man's" khopesh, it is possible that the epsilon axe would be assigned to less valuable or "irregular" infantry while main forces would be equipped with the khopesh.

The axe head was made out of either bronze or copper and it was then fitted on to the haft using tangs. The structure of the weapon made its ability to penetrate armour very weak so it would mainly be used against weakly armoured opponents. Like the bardiche, the head of the axe is usually affixed to the haft near the middle or bottom, however in almost all versions of the epsilon axe the blade is attached at three different points: top, middle, bottom. These tangs would be wedged into the grooves of the heft. Then they would be lashed down to ensure a sturdy fit.

The epsilon axe is somewhat more limited than the bardiche axe in that while sharing the same basic design it lacks a point that extends beyond the reach of the haft. This makes it unable to be used as a thrusting weapon, instead only relying on the power of the swing from the combatant. The edge of blade has taken on many different types of shape but the general construction of it has remained the same over time.
