= Fernando Quesada Sanz =

Spanish historian and archaeologist

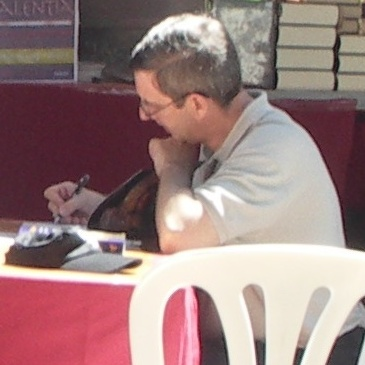
Quesada Sanz in 2009.

Fernando Quesada Sanz (born 1962) is a Spanish historian, archaeologist and writer. Currently a professor of archaeology of the Autonomous University of Madrid, he specializes in the history of the Iberian Peninsula and on ancient warfare and weapons, of which he is a long time writer and expert.

== Biography ==
He graduated in prehistory and archaeology in the AUM in 1992, when he became a professor. In 2012 he became head of the research group Polemos. He has collaborated with Fundación Juan March in 2023 about the topic of weapons throughout history. He is also a usual writer for the Desperta Ferro magazine and a correspondent member of the German Archaeological Institute.

== Awards ==
- Second Premio Nacional de Fin de Estudios (1985).
- Premio Extraordinario de Licenciatura en las especialidades de Prehistoria y Arqueología e Historia Antigua y Medieval.
- Premio Extraordinario de Doctorado en Prehistoria y Arqueología.
- Hislibris Award (2010) to the best historical essay for Armas de la Antigua Iberia
- Vaccea Award (2012) from the Universidad de Valladolid for Investigación y Divulgación Científicas.
- Special mention in the 2015 Egabrense Awards for his work in the Cerro de la Merced Research Project.

== Bibliography ==
- D. Vaquerizo Gil, F. Quesada Sanz, J.F. Murillo Redondo, Protohistoria y Romanización en la Subbética Cordobesa. Una aproximación al desarrollo de la Cultura Ibérica en el Sur de la actual provincia de Córdoba, Junta de Andalucía y Universidad de Córdoba, Sevilla, 2001 ISBN 978-84-8266-203-9.
- C. Farnié Lobensteiner, F. Quesada Sanz, Espadas de hierro, grebas de bronce. Símbolos de poder e instrumentos de guerra a comienzos de la Edad del Hierro en la península ibérica, Monografías del Museo de Arte Ibérico de El Cigarralejo, Murcia, 2005, ISBN 978-84-606-3838-4.
- J. Baena, C. Blasco, F. Quesada (eds.), Los S.I.G. y el análisis espacial en Arqueología, Ediciones de la Universidad Autónoma de Madrid, col. Estudios, Madrid, 1997, ISBN 978-84-7477-630-0.
- F. Quesada Sanz, M. Zamora Merchán (eds.), El caballo en la antigua Iberia. Estudios sobre los équidos en la Edad del Hierro, Bibliotheca Archaeologica Hispana 19. Madrid, 2003, Real Academia de la Historia y Univ. Autónoma de Madrid, ISBN 978-84-95983-20-6
- P. Moret, F. Quesada Sanz (eds.), La guerra en el mundo ibérico y celtibérico (ss. VI-II a. C.), Collection de la Casa de Velázquez, 78, Madrid, 2002, ISBN 84-9555-29-8.
- Máchaira, kopís, falcata in Homenaje a Francisco Torrent, Madrid.
- En torno al origen y procedencia de la falcata ibérica. Archivo Español de Arqueología, 63, 1990.
- Falcatas ibéricas con damasquinados en plata. Verdolay, 2, 1990.
- Arma y símbolo: la falcata ibérica. Instituto de Cultura Juan Gil-Albert, Alicante, 1992.
- Notas sobre el armamento ibérico de Almedinilla, Anales de Arqueología Cordobesa, 3, 1992.
- Algo más que un tipo de espada: la falcata ibérica. Catálogo de la Exposición: La guerra en la Antigüedad. Madrid, 1997.
- El armamento ibérico. Estudio tipológico, geográfico, funcional, social y simbólico de las armas en la Cultura Ibérica (siglos VI-I a. C.) 2 vols. Monographies Instrumentum, 3. Ed. Monique Mergoil, Montagnac, 1997
- Armas para los muertos. Los íberos, príncipes de Occidente Catálogo de la Exposición. Barcelona, 1998.
- Armas de Grecia y Roma: forjaron la historia de la antigüedad clásica, La Esfera de los Libros, Madrid, 2008, ISBN 84-9734-70-06
- Última Ratio Regis, Editorial Polifemo, Madrid, 2009, ISBN 978-84-96813-23-6 Único libro en español, inglés y francés sobre control de armas en la Edad Antigua, Medieval y Moderna.
