= Cross-ndj (hieroglyph) =

Egyptian hieroglyph

Aa27 Aa27 W24
Cross-(shape)
Cross-ndj
in hieroglyphs

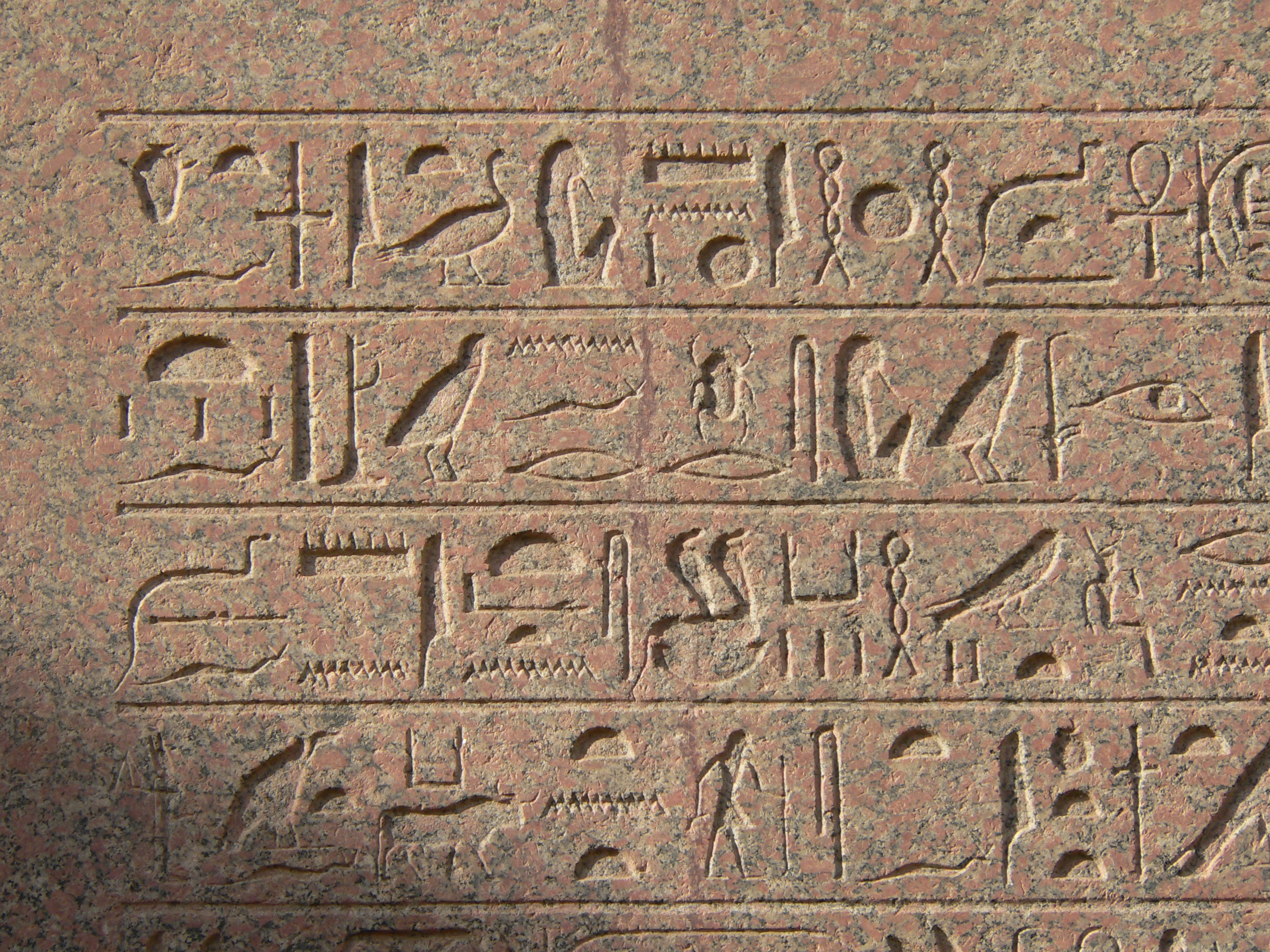
(Example hieroglyph relief). The Cross-ndj hieroglyph is shown in the bottom line at the beginning (at right)(reads right-to-left): W24 X1 X1 Aa27.

The Egyptian hieroglyph ndj (nḏ) (Gardiner Aa27, U+13429 𓐩) has the shape of a cross. It presumably depicts some type of tool such as a mill. It is often written alongside the nu "pot" hieroglyph (W24). It is used as an ideogram or determinative in the context of "grains", "grinding stone", "grind", "to rub out".

Budge's dictionary to the Book of the Dead has the following uses for the hieroglyph:

1—(nos 1,2,4)-"to protect, guard, avenge", and "protector, advocate, avenger"
2—(no. 3)-"homage to thee", (a form of salutation to gods)
3—(nos. 5,6,7)-"discuss a matter with someone", "to converse", "to take counsel"; (uses the 'man-seated hieroglyph' for 'concepts', or 'speech', no. A2) A2

Budge's two-volume dictionary has entries for "rub out" and "grind", both connected to Coptic language words. Of the thirty-three entries, six refer to these two definitions. Entry 24 refers to the Coptic word (n-o-u-t)-(nout), and 29 to (n-o-e-i-t)-(noeit); dictionary entry 24 has seven spellings using determinatives for "grinding", the "block-of-stone" hieroglyph), no. 39, N39, or the "man grinding" hieroglyph, no. 34 (actually unlisted, a man grinding upon a stone-block-mortar), A36
Entry 29, (six spellings, and Coptic word (noeit)), uses the small circle for grain, no. N33B, N33B, or the plural of grains, N33B N33B N33B; also another grain production hieroglyph, nos. U9, U10, U9 U10

== See also ==
- Gardiner's Sign List#Aa. Unclassified
- Gardiner's Sign List#U. Agriculture, Crafts, and Professions
- List of Egyptian hieroglyphs
