= The Falcon of Sparta =

Historical fiction novel

- Book cover of the Falcon of Sparta
- Author: Conn Iggulden
- Language: English
- Subject: The Ten Thousand
- Genre: Historical Fiction
- Publisher: Michael Joseph (First Edition) & Penguin Books
- Publication date: May 3, 2018
- Publication place: United Kingdom
- Media type: Print, Ebook & Audiobook
- Pages: 448
- ISBN: 978-0718181468

The Falcon of Sparta is an historical fiction novel by British author Conn Iggulden. It is loosely based on the Anabasis written in 370 BC by Xenophon.

Part I describes the events leading up to and including the Battle of Cunaxa in 401 BC, in which Prince Cyrus the Younger challenges his elder brother Artaxerxes II to the throne of the Achaemenid Empire. Part II describes the aftermath of the battle, in which the 'Ten Thousand' (a group of Greek mercenaries and camp followers) attempt to escape Persia back to the safety of Greece.

The hardback first edition book was published by Michael Joseph in May 2018 with the paperback published by Penguin Books in May 2019. The audiobook is read by Michael Fox.

== Key characters ==
- Artaxerxes II - Persian Prince and eldest son of Darius II. He ascends to the throne of Persia upon his father's death
- Cyrus the Younger - Persian Prince and younger brother of Artaxerxes. He seeks to overthrow his brother
- Clearchus of Sparta - General of Spartan mercenaries employed by Cyrus
- Xenophon - Greek historian and soldier who leads the ten thousand Greeks following Cunaxa
- Tissaphernes - Persian Satrap of Artaxerxes II who uncovers Cryrus' plans for rebellion
- Menon - A Thessalian mercenary general employed by Cyrus
- Cheirisophus - Spartan who supports Xenophon in guiding the Ten Thousand to safety
- Ariaeus - A Persian general who sides with Cyrus at the Battle of Cunaxa
- Socrates - A Greek philosopher, and former teacher of Xenophon
