= Meno (general) =

Thessalian mercenary general (c.423–c.400 BC)

Meno (/ˈmiːnoʊ/; Greek: Μένων, romanized: Menōn; c. 423 – c. 400 BC), son of Alexidemus, was an ancient Thessalian political figure, probably from Pharsalus.

He is famous both for the eponymous dialogue written by Plato and for his role as one of the generals leading different contingents of Greek mercenaries in Xenophon's Anabasis. Meno is reported by both Xenophon and Plato to have been attractive and in the bloom of youth, not yet even having a beard, and was quite young at his death. He had many lovers, including Aristippus of Larissa, Tharypas, and Ariaeus the Persian.

== Classical accounts ==
=== In Xenophon ===
==== Meno's beginning and command ====
Xenophon gives a strongly hostile description of Meno as a disreputable, ambitious and dishonest youth, willing to commit any injustice for advancement, and immeasurably greedy for wealth, although some modern scholars read Xenophon as being set on attacking Meno's character, and are unsure what credence to give his descriptions.

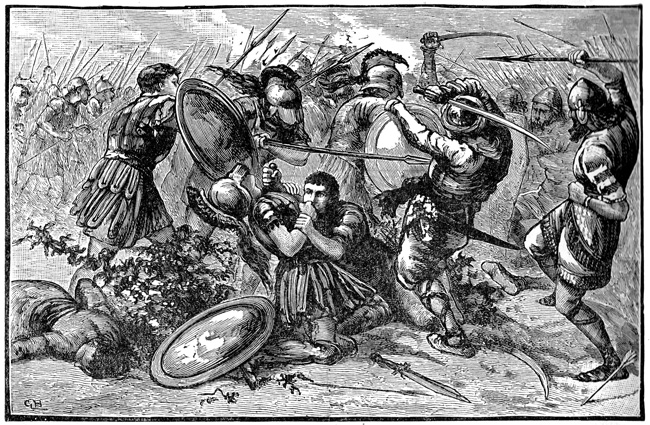
Depiction of the Battle of Cunaxa, in which Meno fought

Meno was only about twenty years old when he was given command of 1000 hoplites and 500 peltasts from Thessaly as hired by Aristippus to assist Cyrus the Younger in his attempt to seize the Persian throne from his brother Artaxerxes. Artaxerxes was made king of Persia upon the death of Darius II, but Cyrus believed that he had a more rightful claim to the throne and gathered an army to contend his kingship. Cyrus gathered together Persian supporters and mercenaries, including Xenophon himself. Cyrus at first deceived the Greeks about the purpose of his mission and led them some considerable way, to the Euphrates River at Thapsacus, before telling them his true intentions.

Xenophon goes into some detail about the march and mentions Meno on a few occasions. Meno escorted, with some of his troops, the Cilician queen Epyaxa back to Cilicia. Meno lost some hundred troops on this mission, either because his troops were caught pillaging and killed by the Cilicians or because they got lost and wandered until they perished. Later, after Cyrus first told the Greeks that he was leading them into battle against Artaxerxes to seize the Persian throne, the Greeks were dismayed and demanded more money before they would continue. Meno won the admiration of Cyrus by persuading his troops to cross the Euphrates first (as a show of their willingness to follow Cyrus) before the other troops had decided. At another point, Meno's soldiers became enraged with Clearchus, the Spartan general, unsuccessfully trying to stone him to death, an act which nearly led to Meno's and Clearchus' men openly fighting between them. This story, along with his loss of 100 men in Cilicia, suggests that Meno maintained poor discipline among his troops. Xenophon claims that Meno maintained discipline by participating in his troops' wrongdoings.

==== Meno's cunning and betrayal ====
Cyrus eventually engaged with Artaxerxes' troops headed by Tissaphernes at the Battle of Cunaxa. The Greek contingent won easily, but Cyrus and his troops were repulsed and Cyrus himself was killed in battle. The Greek troops, now led by Clearchus, viewing themselves as the victors, declared their support for Ariaeus, one of Cyrus' commanders and the most senior Persian on their side still living. Ariaeus, accompanied by Meno, his "guest-friend," met privately with Tissaphernes. Ctesias tells us that Tissaphernes here began to plot with Meno to betray the Greeks. Xenophon writes that Clearchus believed that Meno had been pouring false slander about the Greeks into Tissaphernes' ear and was aware that Meno was plotting to seize control of the army from Clearchus with Tissaphernes's favor. Sherylee Bassett suggests that Tissaphernes may have been here deceiving Meno into thinking he would support his leadership aspirations, playing the two main leaders, Clearchus and Meno, off against each other. Ariaeus declined the offer of kingship and Tissaphernes began apparently friendly negotiations with Clearchus for a truce, finally inviting him for a cordial meeting with the other Greek generals and officers. According to Ctesias, some of the Greek soldiers were hesitant to attend the meeting, but Meno persuaded the soldiers, who thereby persuaded the reluctant Clearchus, to comply. Clearchus, with four other generals (Agis of Arcadia, Socrates of Achaea, Proxenus of Boetia and Meno), twenty officers and some two hundred troops visited the tent of Tissaphernes but they were betrayed, Clearchus and the generals being captured and all of the officers and as many of the soldiers as could be caught being killed. The generals were taken to Artaxerxes and all were beheaded, except Meno.

==== Meno's demise ====
At this point, Ctesias' account simply tells us that Meno was spared. Diodorus says Meno was spared since he alone was thought willing to betray the Greeks. According to Xenophon, Meno was kept alive and tortured for a year before finally being killed. Ctesias was, at the time, a physician to Artaxerxes and was witness to some of the events (for example, attending to Clearchus before he was beheaded), so he may be considered more reliable than Xenophon, who, as he himself admits, is merely repeating a report that he heard. On the other hand, the two reports need not necessarily differ, if Ctesias only knew of Meno being spared and was not aware that he was subsequently tortured and ultimately killed.

=== In Plato ===
Meno appears in his eponymous Platonic dialogue as a guest of Anytus, accompanied by a considerable retinue of slaves. Meno's stay in Athens is short and Socrates mentions that initially Meno was not able to stay to attend the mysteries, although he agreed during the dialogue to stay longer to hear more of Socrates' answers. The dialogue is probably not historical, but is meant to take place in 402 BC, shortly before Meno's Persian generalship, or in 401 BC, while he is en route to Persia.

Socrates says that Meno is a former student of Gorgias, and Meno notes that he has made many speeches on virtue before large audiences. He asks Socrates whether virtue can be taught, learned through experience, or comes in some other way. After Socrates claims to not know the answer, he uses his Socratic method to ask a number of questions and prompt deeper thinking into the topic. Meno suggests that there are different forms of virtue appropriate to the different roles people play in society. Socrates objects to this notion and instead argues that there must be a commonality to virtue across all people. Indeed, Socrates presents a series of common arguments here concerning the idea of a general form which must underlie virtue. The two are then led into complex epistemological issues of knowing, learning, and memory. Dominic Scott suggests that Socrates manages to secure "some limited improvements" in Meno's character by the end of the dialogue.

== See also ==
- List of speakers in Plato's dialogues

== Sources ==
=== Ancient sources ===
- Xenophon, Anabasis, I.2, I.4-5, I.7-8, II.1-2 & II.4-6
- Ctesias, Photius' summary of Ctesias' Persica, §64 & §68-69
- Plutarch, Life of Artaxerxes (the one mention of Meno is a quote from Ctesias)
- Diodorus Siculus, Bibliotheca historica XIV.19.8 & XIV.27.2
- Plato, Meno

=== Modern sources ===
- Bassett, Sherylee R. "Innocent Victims or Perjurers Betrayed? The Arrest of the Generals in Xenophon's Anabasis," The Classical Quarterly, New Series, 52: 2 (2002) pp 447–461
- Bigwood, J. M. "The Ancient Accounts of the Battle of Cunaxa," The American Journal of Philology, 104:4 (Winter, 1983) pp 340–357
- Brown, Truesdell S. "Menon of Thessaly" Historia: Zeitschrift für Alte Geschichte, 35:4 (1986) pp 387–404
- Hoerber, Robert G. "Plato's Meno," Phronesis, 5:2 (1960), pp 78–102
- Jonkvorst, Ronald Henk, Plato Meno dramatic-historical dating 401 BC, (Brave New Books 2021) ISBN 9789402158083
- Nails, Debra, The People of Plato: A Prosopography of Plato and Other Socratics, (Hackett 2002) pp 204–20
- Uchicago.edu files: https://cpb-us-w2.wpmucdn.com/voices.uchicago.edu/dist/5/1710/files/2019/02/Meno-in-Nails-People-of-Plato-23vxoyd.pdf
- The Internet Encyclopedia of Philosophy

=== Historical novels ===
- Valerio Massimo Manfredi L' Armata Perduta (The Lost Army), Arnoldo Mondadori Editore S.p.a. 2007
