= Socrates of Achaea =

Greek mercenary general (c. 436–401 BC)

Socrates (Ancient Greek: Σωκράτης) (c. 436 BC – 401 BC) was a Greek mercenary general from Achaea who traveled to Persia to fight at the Battle of Cunaxa. Xenophon describes him as brave in war and a reliable friend. Socrates was summoned by Cyrus, with whom he was already connected, to bring as many troops as he could muster under the pretense that Cyrus intended to attack Tissaphernes. Socrates had previously been besieging Miletus alongside Pasion the Megarian. Socrates brought Cyrus about 500 hoplites. Socrates and the other troops were only later told that Cyrus intended to seize the Persian throne from his brother Artaxerxes. Socrates fought at the Battle of Cunaxa and the Greek forces were able to drive the Persians into retreat, but Cyrus and his force faced heavy casualties and Cyrus himself was killed in battle.

With Cyrus dead, the Greek troops were left in limbo, trying to make arrangements to return home first with Ariaeus (Cyrus' good friend and second in command at the battle) and then with Tissaphernes (one of the Persian generals at the battle). Eventually Socrates and several other Greek generals were betrayed by Tissaphernes and Ariaeus. Socrates, along with Clearchus, Agis of Arcadia, Menon of Thessaly and Proxenus of Boeotia were summoned for a cordial meeting in the tent of Tissaphernes. They were seized and taken to Artaxerxes, and beheaded.
