= Ten Thousand =

5th-century BC mercenary force

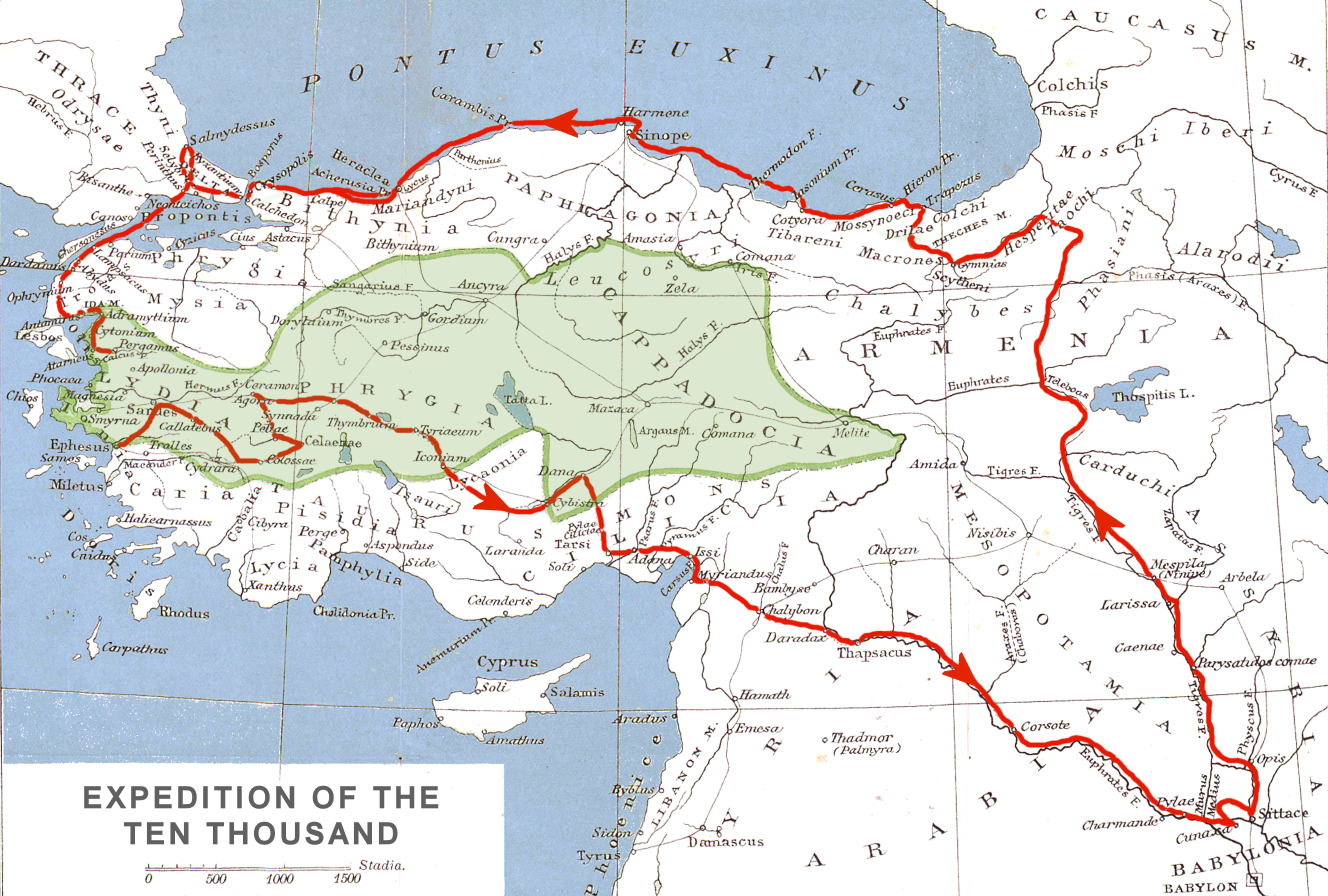
Route of Xenophon and the Ten Thousand (red line) in the Achaemenid Empire. The satrapy of Cyrus the Younger is delineated in green.

The Ten Thousand (Ancient Greek: οἱ Μύριοι, hoi Myrioi) were a force of mercenary units, mainly Greeks, employed by Cyrus the Younger to attempt to wrest the throne of the Persian Empire from his brother, Artaxerxes II. Their march to the Battle of Cunaxa and back to Greece (401–399 BC) was recorded by Xenophon, one of their leaders, in his work Anabasis. Between 401 and 399 BC, the Ten Thousand marched across Anatolia, fought the Battle of Cunaxa, and then marched back to Greece.

== Service under Cyrus the Younger ==
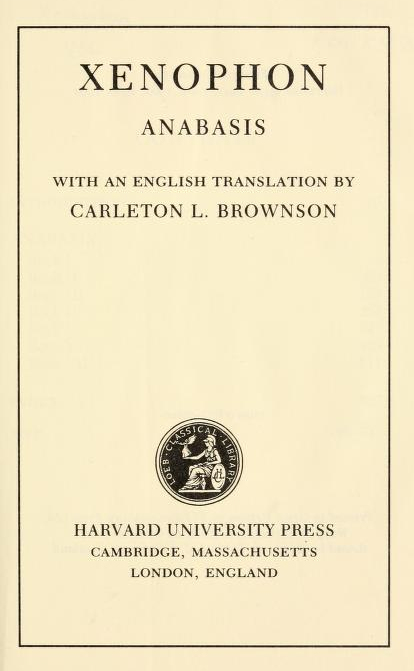
Xenophon's Anabasis

In his Anabasis, Xenophon states that the Greek heavy troops routed their opposition twice at Cunaxa at the cost of only one Greek soldier wounded. Only after the battle did they hear that Cyrus had been killed, making their victory irrelevant and the expedition a failure.

== Stranded ==
The Ten Thousand found themselves far from home with no food, no employer, and no reliable allies.

They offered to make their Persian ally Ariaeus king, but he refused on the grounds that he was not of royal blood and would not find enough support among the Persians to keep the throne.

They then offered their services to Tissaphernes, a leading satrap of Artaxerxes, but he demanded their complete surrender, which they refused. This presented Tissaphernes with a problem – a large army of heavily armed troops, which he could not defeat by frontal assault. He supplied them with food and, after a long wait, led them northwards for home.

Meanwhile he succeeded in luring away the Persian general Ariaeus and his light troops.

The Greek senior officers accepted the invitation of Tissaphernes to a feast where they were taken prisoner, led before the king, and executed.

== New leadership and retreat ==
The Greeks elected new officers, Timasion, Xanthicles, Cleanor, Philesius, and Xenophon, and set out to march northwards to the Black Sea, through Corduene and Armenia.

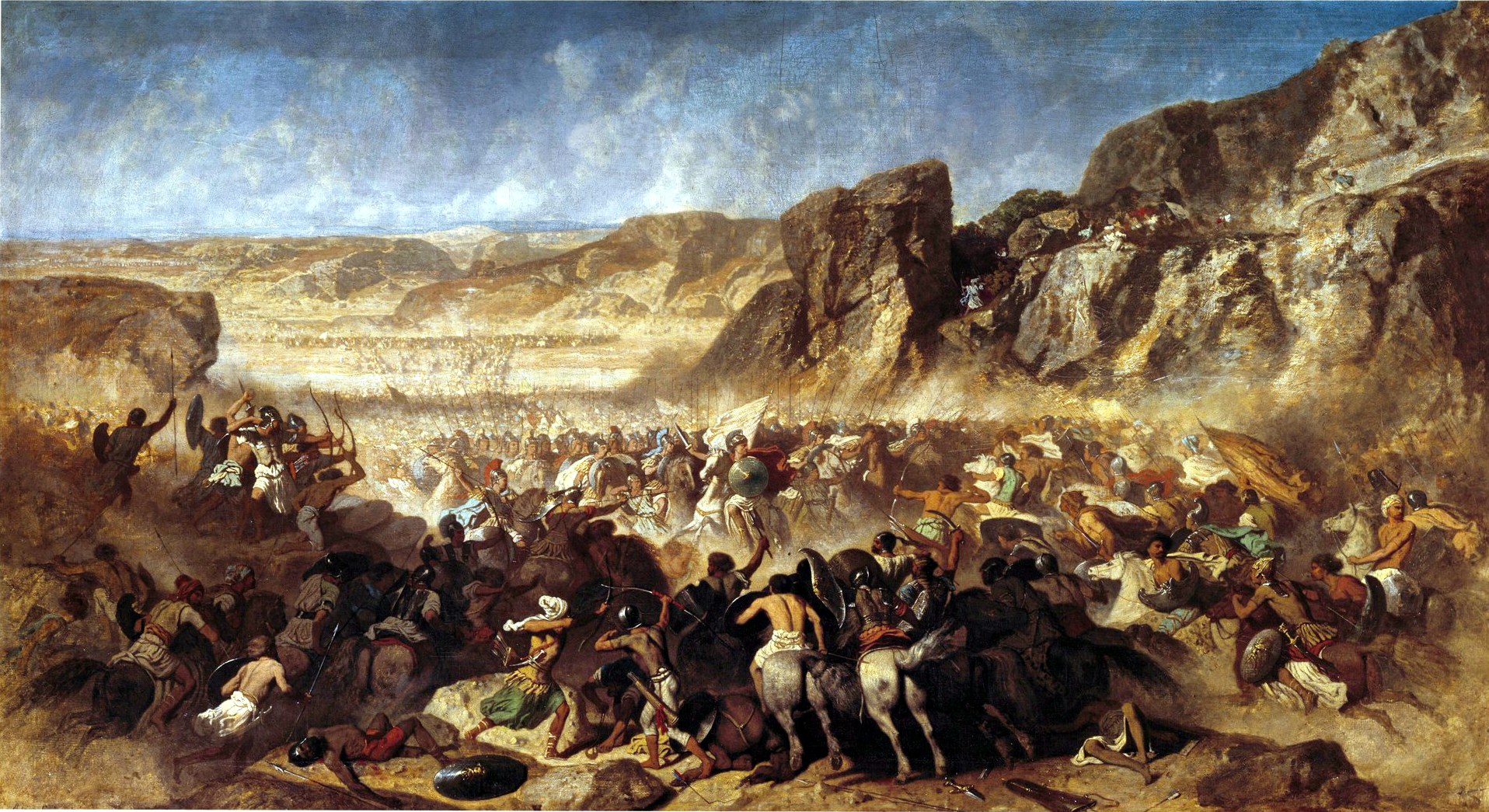
Retreat of the Ten Thousand at the Battle of Cunaxa, by Jean-Adrien Guignet. Louvre

Xenophon and his men initially had to deal with volleys from a minor force of harassing Persian missile cavalry. Every day, this cavalry, finding no opposition from the Ten Thousand, moved cautiously closer and closer.

One night, Xenophon formed a body of archers and light cavalry. When the Persian cavalry arrived the next day, now shooting within several yards, Xenophon suddenly unleashed his new cavalry in a charge, smashing into the stunned and confused enemy, killing many and routing the rest.

Tissaphernes pursued Xenophon with a vast force, and when the Greeks reached the wide and deep Great Zab river, they seemed to be surrounded. A Rhodian proposed a plan in exchange for a talent; all goats, cattle, sheep, and donkeys were to be slaughtered and their bodies stuffed with hay, laid across the river, and sewn up and covered with soil so as not to be slippery. This was refused, for it would have been impossible to implement, and so the Greeks simply turned around, with the Persians refusing to pursue.

That Xenophon was able to feed his force in the heart of a vast empire with a hostile population was considered astonishing. American historian Theodore Ayrault Dodge notes:

On this retreat also was first shown the necessary, if cruel, means of arresting a pursuing enemy by the systematic devastation of the country traversed and the destruction of its villages to deprive him of food and shelter. And Xenophon is moreover the first who established in the rear of the phalanx a reserve from which he could at will feed weak parts of his line. This was a superb first conception.

The Ten Thousand eventually made their way into the land of the Carduchians, a wild tribe inhabiting the mountains of modern southeastern Turkey,

...a fierce, war-like race, who had never been conquered. Once the Great King had sent into their country an army of 120,000 men, to subdue them, but of all that great host not one had ever seen his home again.

The Ten Thousand made their way in and were fired at with stones and arrows for several days before they reached a defile where the main Carduchian host stood. In the Battle of the Carduchian Defile, Xenophon had 8,000 men make a diversionary attack on this host whilst he marched the other 2,000 under cover of a rainstorm to a pass revealed by a prisoner, and

...having made their way to the rear of the main pass, at daylight, under cover of the morning mist, they boldly pushed in upon the astonished Carducians. The blare of their many trumpets gave notice of their successful detour to Xenophon, as well as adding to the confusion of the enemy. The main army at once joined in the attack from the valley side, and the Carducians were driven from their stronghold.

After heavy mountain fighting, the Greeks made their way to the northern foothills of the mountains at the Centrites River, only to find a major Persian force blocking the route north. With the Carduchians surging toward the Greek rear, Xenophon again faced the threat of total destruction in battle.

Xenophon's scouts quickly found another ford across the river, but the Persians moved and blocked this as well. Xenophon sent a small force back toward the other ford, causing the anxious Persians to detach a major part of their force. Xenophon stormed and completely overwhelmed the force remaining at his ford, while the Greek detachment made a forced march to this bridgehead.

This was among the first attacks in depth ever made, 23 years after Delium and 30 years before Epaminondas' more famous use of it at Leuctra.

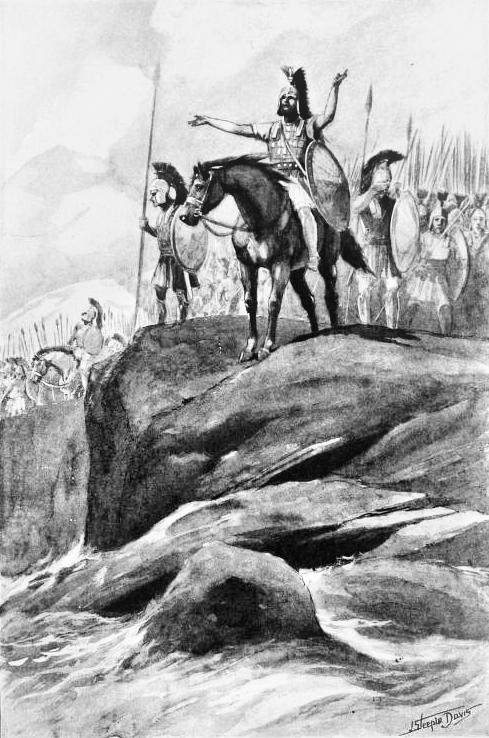
Xenophon and the Ten Thousand hail the sea, 19th-century illustration

Winter had by now arrived as the Greeks marched through Armenia "absolutely unprovided with clothing suitable for such weather", inflicting more casualties than they suffered through their ambush of a local satrap's force and the flanking of another force.

At a stage when the Greeks were in desperate need of food, they decided upon attacking a wooden castle known to have provisions. The castle, however, was located on a hill surrounded by forest. Xenophon ordered small parties of his men to appear on the hill road; and when the defenders flung boulders, a soldier would leap into the trees, and he "did this so often that at last there was quite a heap of stones lying in front of him, but he himself was untouched." Then, "the other men followed his example, and made it a sort of game, enjoying the sensation, pleasant alike to old and young, of courting danger for a moment, and then quickly escaping it.

When the stones were almost exhausted, the soldiers raced one another over the exposed part of the road", storming the fortress, where most of the now neutralized garrison barely put up a fight. The inhabitants threw their children over the walls, before throwing themselves down to their deaths, both men and women.

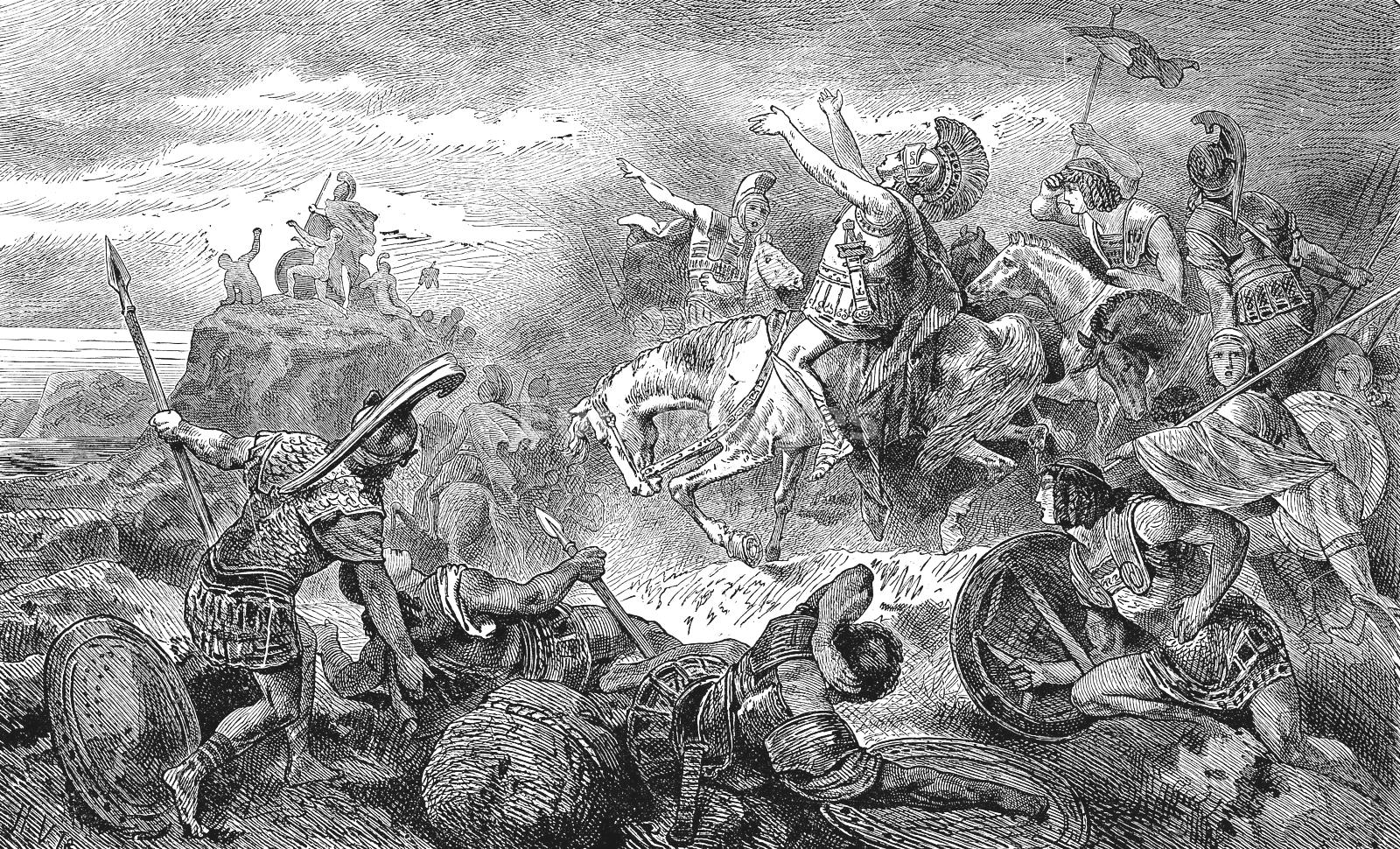
Thálatta! Thálatta! (Θάλαττα! θάλαττα!, "The Sea! The Sea!"). Trapezus (Trebizond) was the first Greek city the Ten Thousand reached on their retreat from inland Persia, 19th-c. illustration by Herman Vogel.

Xenophon records the joyful moment when the Ten Thousand (by then actually far fewer), from the heights of Mount Theches, saw the sea and friendly Greek colonies on the coast, which signified their escape had been made good, whereupon they shouted Θάλαττα! θάλαττα! : Thalatta! Thalatta! ("The sea! The sea!").

Soon after, Xenophon's men reached Trapezus on the coast of the Black Sea (Anabasis 4.8.22). Before they departed, the Greeks made an alliance with the locals and fought one last battle against the Colchians, vassals of the Persians, in mountainous country. Xenophon ordered his men to deploy their line extremely thin, so as to overlap the enemy, while keeping a strong reserve.

The Colchians, seeing they were being outflanked, divided their army to check the Greek deployment, opening a gap in their line through which Xenophon rushed in his reserves, scoring a Greek victory.

=== Failure of plans for shipment to Europe ===
On their arrival at Trapezus on the Euxine, the Greek mercenaries sent their Spartan general Cheirisophus to Anaxibius, the Spartan admiral stationed at Byzantium in 400 BC, to obtain a sufficient number of ships to transport them to Europe.

However, when Cheirisophus met them again at Sinope, he brought back nothing from Anaxibius, but civil words and a promise of employment and pay as soon as they came out of the Euxine.

== Final conflict with Pharnabazus (399 BC) ==
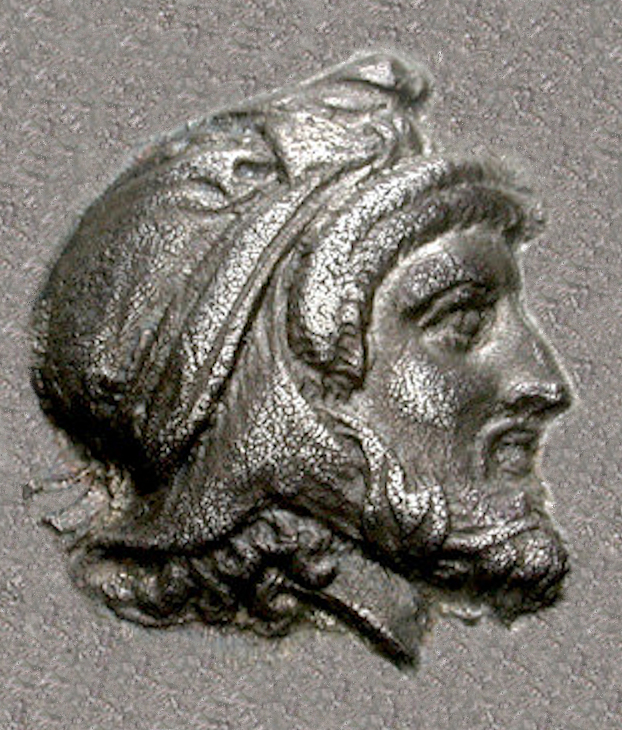
Achaemenid satrap Pharnabazus fought the Ten Thousand to prevent them from plundering Bithynia and Hellespontine Phrygia.

The Ten Thousand under Xenophon continued to the west, some by ship, but most of them by land, and arrived in Bithynia after numerous skirmishes and plunderings. Pharnabazus, satrap of Hellespontine Phrygia, was involved in helping the Bithynians against these plundering raids of the Ten Thousand. He was also trying to stop them from entering Hellespontine Phrygia. His cavalry, which made several raids on the Greek mercenaries, is said to have killed about 500 of them.

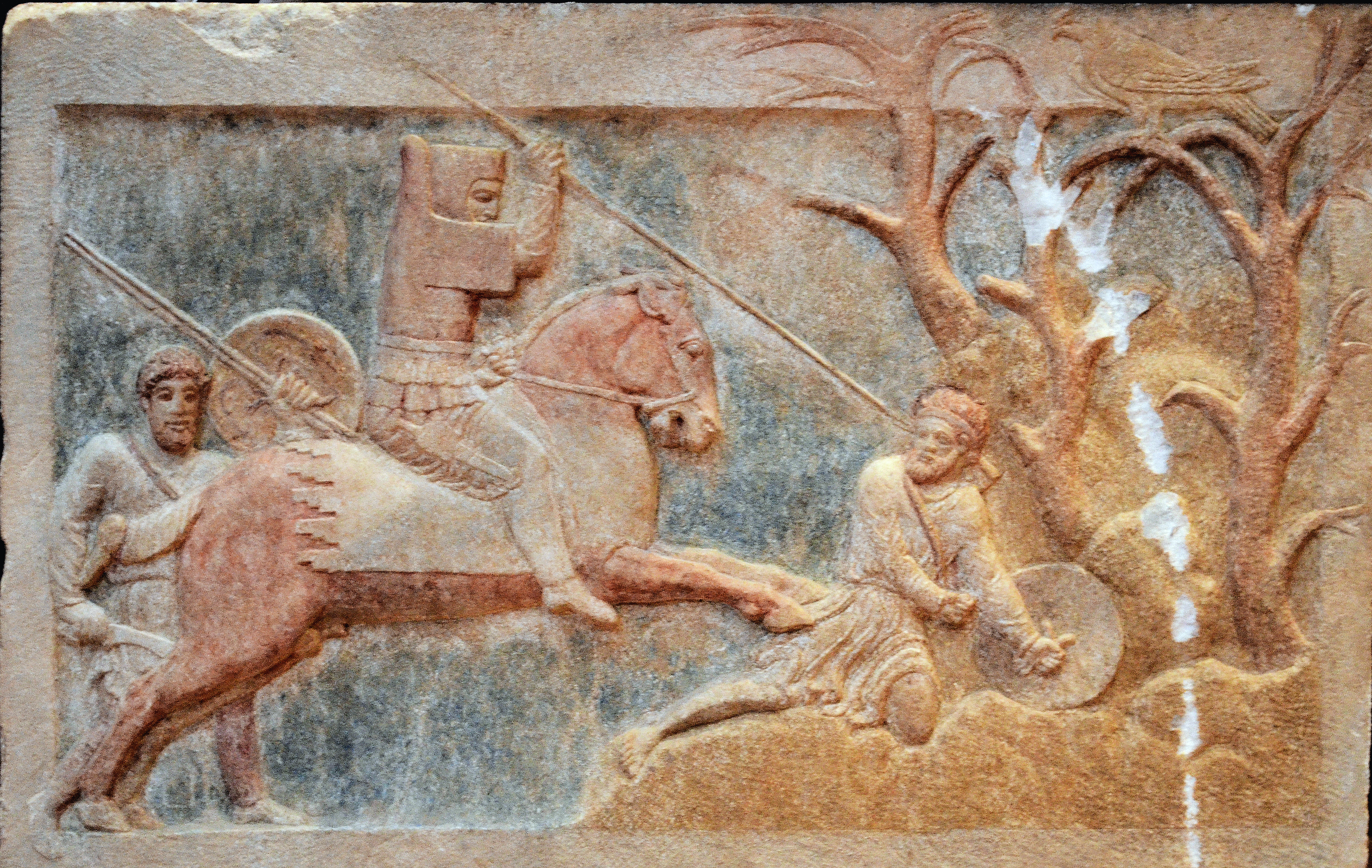
An Athenian mercenary peltast (left) supporting an Achaemenid knight of Hellespontine Phrygia (center) attacking a Greek psilos (right), Altıkulaç Sarcophagus, early fourth century BCE

Pharnabazus then arranged with the Spartan Anaxibius for the rest of the Ten Thousand to be shipped to Byzantium. On their arrival at Chrysopolis, on the Asiatic shore of the Bosporus, Anaxibius, being bribed by Pharnabazus with great promises to withdraw them from his satrapy, promised to pay them and brought them over to Byzantium. Here Anaxibius attempted to send them forward on their march without fulfilling his agreement. A fight ensued, in which Anaxibius was compelled to flee for refuge to the Byzantine acropolis, and which was quelled only by the remonstrances of Xenophon.

Soon after this, the Greeks left the town under the command of the adventurer Coeratades; and Anaxibius issued a proclamation, subsequently acted on by the harmost Aristarchus, that all of Cyrus's soldiers found in Byzantium should be sold as slaves.

== Service in Thrace ==
Coeratades proved to be an incapable employer, and the Ten Thousand (now numbering around 8,000) left his service. Xenophon was courted by Seuthes, a pretender to the Odrysian kingdom, who promised rich territory for pillaging and good pay in return for the Ten Thousand helping him recover his ancestral lands. A campaign against the Thynians ensued, in which the Odrysian Thracians provided cavalry and light infantry to support the hoplites. In the Anabasis, discussions occurred between Xenophon and Seuthes wherein the Greeks and Thracians exchanged tactical wisdom with each other, especially in regards to night-time operations. By the end of this campaign, the force is implied to number around 6,000.

== Service under Sparta in Ionia ==
Although successful in the war, pay for the Ten Thousand was not forthcoming, and so they entered the service of the Spartan general Thibron, who took them to prosecute a war against Tissaphernes in Ionia.

== Composition ==
According to Xenophon, the Ten Thousand were composed of:

- 4,000 hoplites under Xenias the Arcadian, until he deserted in Syria
- 1,500 hoplites and 500 light infantry under Proxenus of Boeotia
- 1,000 hoplites under Sophaenetus of Stymfalia
- 500 hoplites under Socrates the Achaean (not to be confused with the philosopher)
- 300 hoplites and 300 peltasts under Pasion the Megarian, until he deserted in Syria
- 1,000 hoplites, 800 Thracian peltasts, and 200 Cretan archers (and more than 2,000 men who came from Xenias and Pasion when they deserted) under Clearchus of Sparta
- 300 hoplites under Sosis the Syracusan
- 700 Spartan hoplites under Cheirisophus the Spartan
- 1,000 hoplites and 500 Thessalian peltasts under Menon
- 400 Greek mercenaries who had deserted from Artaxerxes' army

In addition, they were backed up by a fleet of 35 triremes under Pythagoras the Spartan and 25 triremes under Tamos the Egyptian, as well as 20,000 Persian troops under Ariaeus the Persian. (Although Xenophon lists them as 100,000, most modern historians believe Ariaeus' troops numbered only about 20,000).

Until shortly after the Battle of Cunaxa, Spartan general Clearchus was recognized as the commander of the army. When Tissaphernes arrested and executed Clearchus, Proxenus, Menon, Agias (possibly the same person as Sophaenetus), and Socrates, their places were taken by Xenophon the Athenian, Timasion the Dardanian, Xanthicles the Achaean, Cleanor the Orchomenian, and Philesius the Achaean, with the Spartan Cheirisophus as the general commander.

When the Ten Thousand started their journey in 401 BC, Xenophon stated that they numbered around 10,400. At the time Xenophon left them two years later, their number had dwindled to just under 6,000.

== Legacy ==
In view of his originality and tactical genius, Xenophon's conduct of the retreat caused Dodge to name the Athenian the greatest general to precede Alexander the Great.

== Cultural influences ==
- The 1965 novel The Warriors is inspired by Anabasis. It tells the story of a gang (the Dominators) from New York's Coney Island forced to fight their way home from the Bronx after an all-city gang meeting at which a would-be gang-unifier is killed, the Dominators are blamed, and lose their leader. The novel was adapted into the 1979 film The Warriors. In the film, the would-be emperor figure is named Cyrus, the Coney Island gang's fallen leader is named Cleon, and the film's final scenes take place at the edge of the sea.
- The novel The Sea, the Sea by Iris Murdoch, winner of the 1978 Booker Prize, was named for this event.
- David Drake's 1988 novel The Forlorn Hope features a plot revolving around a group of mercenaries caught behind enemy lines, who must fight their way out. Drake's own writings describe Xenophon's Anabasis as the model for the first segment of the book.
- Harold Coyle's 1993 novel The Ten Thousand shows the bulk of US Forces in modern Europe fighting their way across and out of Germany after the Germans steal nuclear weapons being removed from Ukraine.
- The 1997 video game Age of Empires has a campaign mission called "Xenophon's March" based on this event. In the mission, the player has to lead a squad of Greek troops through hostile territory to get home.
- The 2001 novel The Ten Thousand by Michael Curtis Ford is a fictional account of this group's exploits.
- Shane Brennan's In the Tracks of the Ten Thousand: A Journey on Foot through Turkey, Syria and Iraq (London: Robert Hale, 2005) is an account of his 2000 journey to retrace the steps of the Ten Thousand.
- Valerio Massimo Manfredi's 2007 novel L'armata perduta (The Lost Army) tells the story of the army through Abira, a Syrian girl, who decides to follow a Greek warrior named Xeno (Xenophon).
- John G. Hemry's The Lost Fleet series, is based on the Anabasis and Arthurian legend. After a lost battle deep in enemy space, the leadership of the alliance fleet gets captured and executed, and the long-lost hero must lead his desperate fleet home to safety.
- Paul Kearney's 2008 novel The Ten Thousand is set in a fantasy world based on Xenophon's record of the historical Ten Thousand.
- John Ringo's 2008 novel The Last Centurion tells the story of a U.S. Stryker company left in Iran after a worldwide plague, which must repeat the journey of the Ten Thousand. The Ten Thousand and Anabasis are frequently mentioned.
- Finnish artist Petri Hiltunen has portrayed the campaign in his two-part comic album Anabasis. It was published by Arktinen Banaani in 2011 (Anabasis: 1. Osa, Kyyroksen sotaretki) and 2013 (Anabasis: 2. Osa, Tuhanten miesten marssi).
- The 2018 novel The Falcon of Sparta by British author Conn Iggulden provides a fictionalized account of the plight of the Ten Thousand.
- In the 2018 limited series The Terror, Anabasis is recommended as a literary parallel to the grueling walk out by the men of the Franklin expedition.

== See also ==
- Arexion
