= Proxenus of Boeotia =

Greek mercenary (died 401 BC)

Proxenus of Boeotia (Ancient Greek: Πρόξενος) was a disciple of Gorgias and a friend of Xenophon. He came from the city of Thebes in Boeotia. Being connected by the ties of hospitality with the Cyrus the younger, the latter engaged him in his service. He came to Sardes at the head of 1,500 heavy armed, and 500 light armed soldiers (Xen. Anab. i. 1. § 11, 2. § 3.) It was at his invitation that Xenophon was induced to enter the service of Cyrus (iii. 1. §§ 4, 8). He was one of the four ill-fated generals whom Clearchus of Sparta persuaded to accompany him to Tissaphernes. He was seized with the rest, and taken to the king of Persia, and afterwards put to death (ii. 5. § 31, &c. 6. § 1). Xenophon speaks of him as a man whose ambition was under the influence of strict probity, and who was especially anxious to secure the affections of his soldiers, so that while the well-disposed readily obeyed him, he failed to inspire the rest with a wholesome fear of his authority (ii. 6. § 17, &c.). He was 30 years of age at the time of his death (401 BC). He also had intentions of following a political career, as mentioned by Xenophon.
