= Xenias =

Xenias may refer to:

- Xenias of Arcadia, also Xenias of Parrhasia, a general who commanded mercenaries in the service of Cyrus the Younger
- Xenias of Elis, an Elean of great wealth, who was a proxenos of Sparta
