= Glus =

Glus may refer to:

- Glos or Glus (Ancient Greek: Γλοῦς), son of Tamos, a highranking Egyptian in service of the Persian Empire
- Glus, a character in the Deltora series
