= Aristippus of Larissa =

Late 5th-century BC Thessalian noble from Larissa

Aristippus (Ancient Greek: Ἀρίστιππος) of Larissa in Thessaly was one of the Aleuadae who received lessons from the philosopher Gorgias when he visited Thessaly.

Aristippus obtained money and troops from Cyrus the Younger to resist a faction opposed to him, and placed the general Meno, who is described in ancient sources as Aristippus's lover, in command over these forces.
