= Hydarnes (disambiguation) =

Hydarnes (c. 6th century BC) was one of the seven Persian conspirators who overthrew the Pseudo-Smerdis.

Hydarnes (also spelled Idernes), a Greek transliteration of the Old Persian name Vidṛna, may also refer to:

- Hydarnes the Younger (c. 5th century BC), son of Hydarnes, and a commander under Xerxes I
- Hydarnes (father of Stateira), nobleman active during the reign of Darius II (r. 423 – 404 BC), and descendant (perhaps grandson) of Hydarnes the Younger
