= Anaxibius =

Late 5th/early 4th-century BC Spartan general

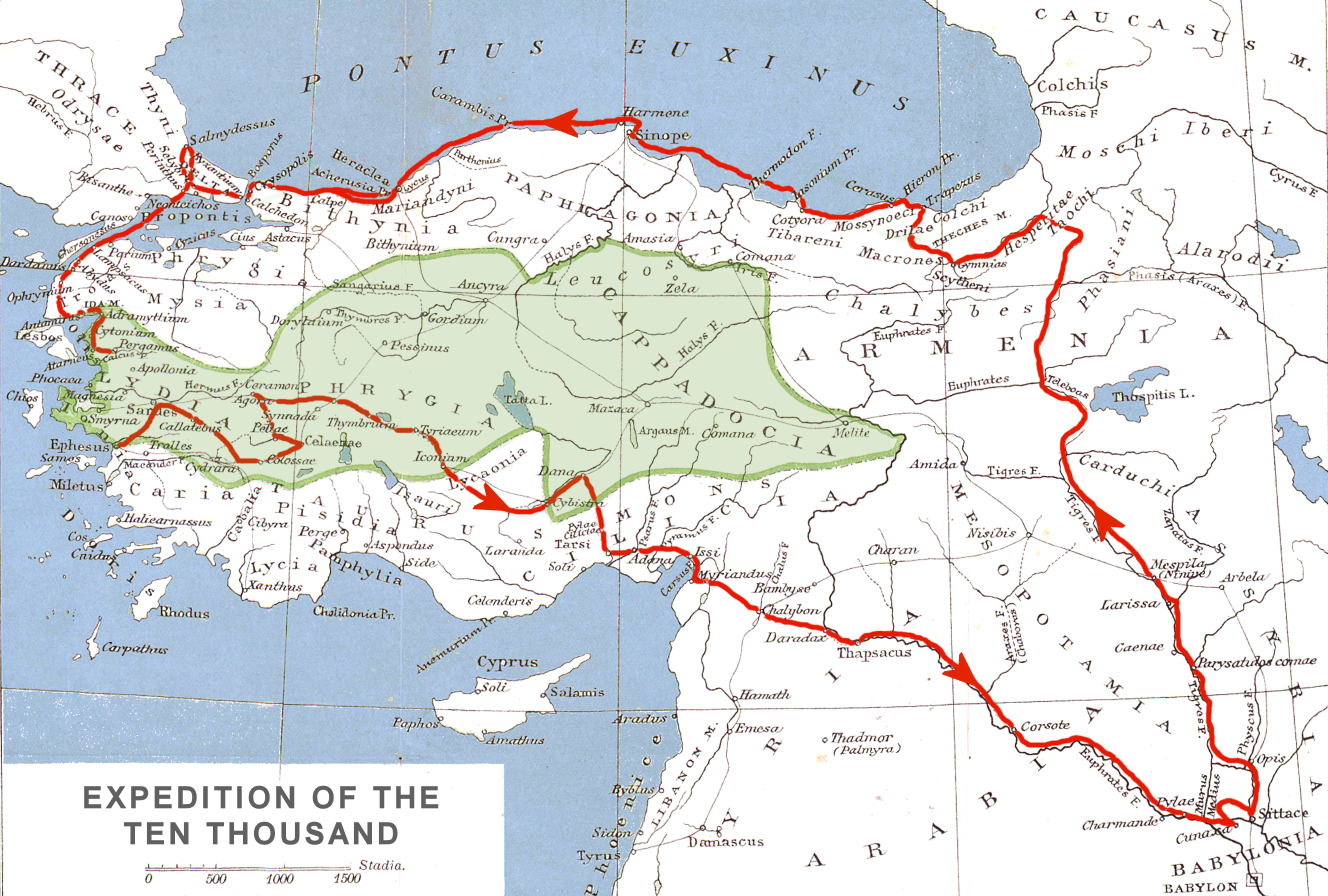
Route of Xenophon and the Ten Thousand (red line) in the Achaemenid Empire. The satrapy of Cyrus the Younger is delineated in green. Anaxibius shipped the Ten Thousand of Xenophon from Chrysopolis to Byzantium.

Anaxibius (Ancient Greek: Ἀναξίβιος), was the Spartan admiral stationed at Byzantium in 400 BC, to whom the Greek troops of Cyrus the Younger, on their arrival at Trapezus on the Euxine, sent their general, Cheirisophus, to obtain a sufficient number of ships to transport them to Europe.

However, when Cheirisophus met them again at Sinope, he brought back nothing from Anaxibius but civil words and a promise of employment and pay as soon as they came out of the Euxine. On their arrival at Chrysopolis, on the Asiatic shore of the Bosporus, Anaxibius, being bribed by Pharnabazus with great promises to withdraw them from his satrapy, again engaged to furnish them with pay, and brought them over to Byzantium. Here he attempted to get rid of them, and to send them forward on their march without fulfilling his agreement. A fight ensued, in which Anaxibius was compelled to flee for refuge to the Acropolis, and which was quelled only by the remonstrances of Xenophon.

Soon after this the Greeks left the town under the command of the adventurer Coeratades, and Anaxibius issued a proclamation, subsequently acted on by the harmost Aristarchus of Sparta, that all of Cyrus's soldiers found in Byzantium should be sold as slaves.

However, soon after Anaxibius was superseded in command. So finding himself neglected by Pharnabazus, he attempted to revenge himself by persuading Xenophon to lead the Greek army to invade Pharnabazus's satrapy. But the enterprise was stopped by the threats by Aristarchus.

In 389, Anaxibius was sent out from Sparta to supersede Dercyllidas in the command at Abydus, and to check the rising fortunes of Athens in the Hellespont. Here he met at first with some success, until 388 when Iphicrates, who had been sent against him by the Athenians, contrived to intercept him on his return from seeking to take possession of the city of Antandrus, which had promised to revolt and join Anaxibius. Anaxibius, coming suddenly on the Athenian ambush, and foreseeing the certainty of his own defeat, told his men to save themselves and flee. His own duty, he said, required him to die there; and, with a small body of comrades, he remained on the spot, fighting till he fell.

Anaxibius is described as having died fighting with a youth he loved by his side, though the origin or social status of this youth is unclear as he is not described as a soldier. This relationship may have been an uncharacteristic extension of pederastic feeling to a youth who was not necessarily Spartan and possibly a slave, considering how he was accompanying rather than fighting alongside Anaxibius.
