= Coeratadas =

Late 5th-century BC Theban general

Coeratadas (Greek: Κοιρατάδας) was a Theban who commanded some Boeotian forces under Clearchus, the Spartan harmost (military governor) at Byzantium, when the city was being besieged by the Athenians in 408 BC. He was a general in the Peloponnesian War and made a "sensational" escape from Athens as a prisoner of war.

When Clearchus crossed over to Asia to obtain money from Pharnabazus, and to collect forces, he left the command of the garrison to Helixus, a Megarian, and Coeratadas, who, soon after, were compelled to surrender themselves as prisoners when certain parties within the town opened the gates to Alcibiades. They were sent to Athens, but during the disembarkation at Piraeus, Coeratadas managed to escape into the crowd, and made his way safely to Decelea.

In 400 BC, when the Cyrean Greeks arrived at Byzantium, Coeratadas, who was seeking employment as a general, prevailed on them to choose him as their commander, promising to lead them into Thrace on a profitable expedition and to supply them with plentiful provisions. Almost immediately, it was discovered that he had no means of supporting them for even a single day, and accordingly, he was obliged to relinquish his command.

== Sources ==
- The expedition of Cyrus By Xenophon, Robin Waterfield, Tim Rood
