= Cheirisophus =

Cheirisophus can refer to two different men from classical antiquity:

- Cheirisophus (general), a Spartan general who fought in the Greco-Persian Wars.
- Cheirisophus (sculptor), an ancient Greek artist
