= Arexion =

Ancient Greek seer

Arexion (Ancient Greek: Ἀρηξίων) was a seer (Greek μάντις, one who practices divination). He served under Xenophon with the Ten Thousand in the Persian Expedition recorded by Xenophon in his work, Anabasis. He was the presiding soothsayer during this expedition after Silanos from Ambracia deserted the army. As a soothsayer he practiced extispicy, the observance of animal entrails to foresee future events. He is also referred to as Arexion the Arcadian (Ἀρηξίων Ἀρκάς) which indicates he was a native of Arcadia, a region in the center of the Peloponnese.

Seers were not always mentioned in battle accounts, but they were always present. The Greek army took soothsaying very seriously and would not advance until the seers would reveal favorable omens. They make their appearance in Herodotus and Xenophon when their actions seemed unusually noteworthy. Arexion the Seer is mentioned twice in the Anabasis, the first time being when the army is in Port Calpe in Asiatic Thrace. After Arexion's sacrifice did not give good omens, the Greek army waited a day. Two sets of three sacrifices were made by Arexion and other soothsayers the following day with still no favorable results. The soldiers became frustrated and accused Xenophon of bribing the seer to say that the sacrifices are unfavorable for departure.

Later Arexion is mentioned sacrificing before the battle with Spithridates and Rhathines from Pharnabazus III, this time obtaining favorable omens with his first sacrifice.
