= Cheirisophus (general) =

Late 5th-century BC Spartan general

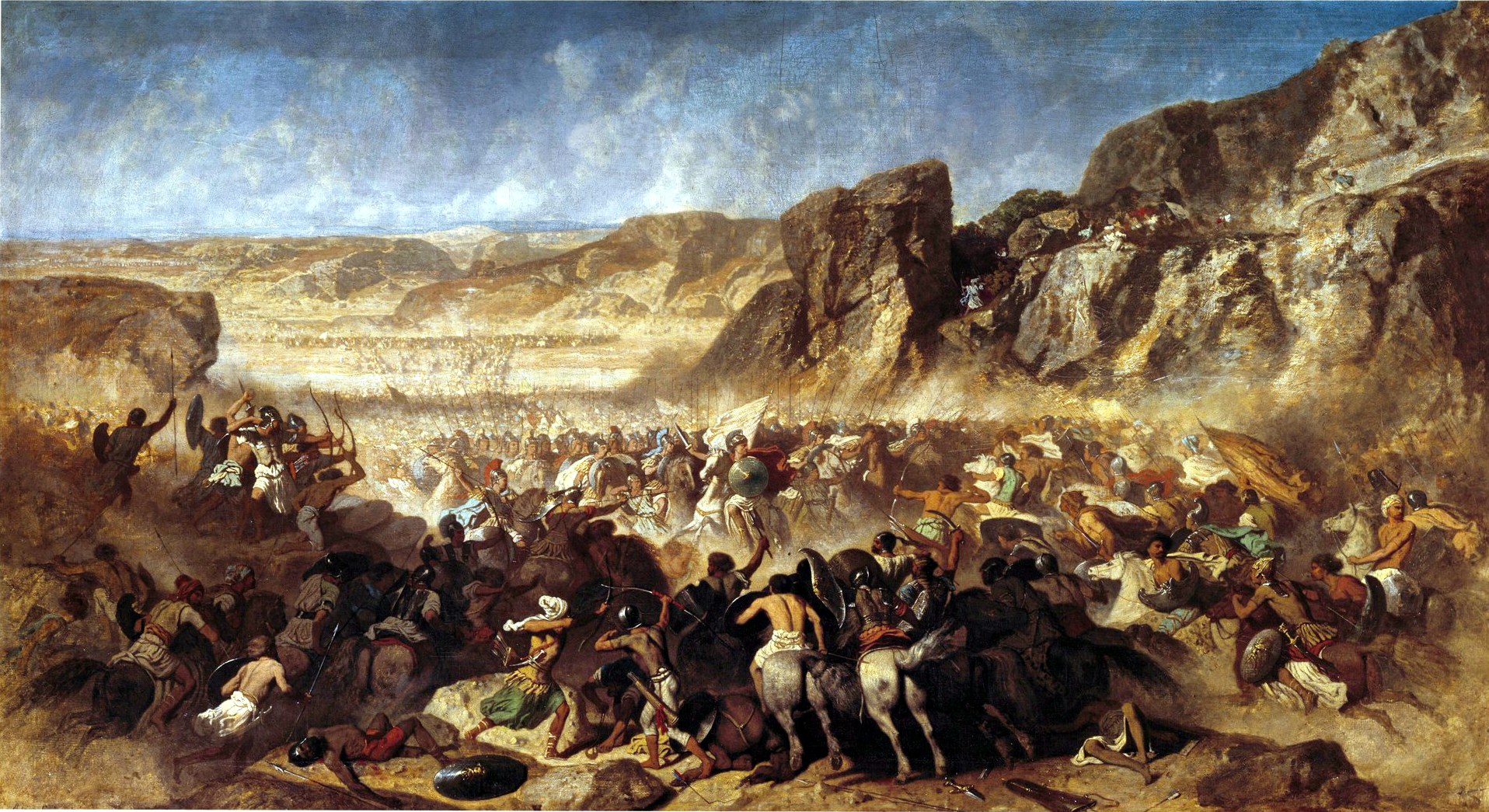
Battle of Cunaxa, in which Cheirisophus led the Spartan troops against Artaxerxes.

Cheirisophus (Ancient Greek: Χειρίσοφος) was a Spartan general who fought with the Ten Thousand under Cyrus the Younger. Cheirisophus was sent by the Spartan ephors with 700 heavily armed men (800 according to Diodorus Siculus) to aid Cyrus the Younger in his expedition against his brother Artaxerxes in 401 BC. He joined Cyrus on his march at Issus in Cilicia. After the Battle of Cunaxa, Clearchus sent Cheirisophus with a delegation to the Persian general Ariaeus to make an offer of placing him on the Persian throne, an offer which Ariaeus declined.

After the arrest of Clearchus and the other generals, through the treachery of Tissaphernes, Cheirisophus took an active part in encouraging the troops and in otherwise dealing with the emergency of being a leaderless army deep in enemy territory, and, on the suggestion of Xenophon, was appointed to lead the vanguard of the retreating army. He held this post throughout the retreat in cooperation with Xenophon. There was only one time that any difference arose between them, and that was caused by Cheirisophus having struck, in a fit of angry suspicion, an Armenian who was guiding them, and who left them because of the insult.

When the Greeks had arrived at Trapezus on the Euxine, Cheirisophus volunteered to go to his friend Anaxibius, the Spartan admiral at Byzantium, to obtain a number of ships to transport them to Europe; but he was not successful in his appeal. On his return to the army, which he found at Sinope, he was chosen commander-in-chief, Xenophon having declined the position for himself on the grounds that he was not a Spartan. Cheirisophus, however, was unable to enforce his authority, or to restrain the Arcadian and Achaean soldiers from plundering the Heracleots. On the sixth or seventh day after Cheirisophus's election, these troops, who formed more than half the army, separated themselves from the rest and departed by sea under ten generals whom they had appointed.

Xenophon then offered to continue the march with the remainder of the forces, under the command of Cheirisophus, but Cheirisophus declined the proposal based on advice from Neon, who hoped to find vessels at Calpe furnished by Cleander, the Spartan harmost at Byzantium, and wished to reserve them exclusively for their own portion of the army. With the small division still under his command, Cheirisophus arrived safely at Calpe, where he died from the effects of a medicine which he had taken for a fever.
