= Castolus (Lydia) =

Town of ancient Lydia

Castolus or Kastolos (Ancient Greek: Καστωλός) was a town of ancient Lydia. Xenophon says that king Darius II appointed his son Cyrus the Younger, commander of all the forces that muster at the plain of Castolus (Castoli Campus; Καστωλοῦ πεδίον).

The site of the plain of Castolus is fixed as the Burçak Ovası; the site of the town is unknown.
