= Pythagoras the Spartan =

Late 5th-century BC Greek mercenary

Pythagoras, or Pythagoras the Spartan (Ancient Greek: Πυθαγόρας), was a mercenary Greek admiral hired to command the first fleet of Cyrus the Younger during his campaign to claim the Persian throne during 401 BC. Pythagoras led a fleet of 35 triremes as a backup force to Cyrus's hoplites of the Ten Thousand and his own Persian troops.

Pythagoras led Cyrus' first fleet, the second being led by Tamos the Egyptian consisting of 25 triremes. Pythagoras's fleet is known to be from the Peloponnese.

Pythagoras is stated as Lacedaemonian, it is however not known if he is directly from Sparta.
