= Xenias of Arcadia =

Late 5th-century BC Greek mercenary general

Xenias of Arcadia (Ancient Greek: Ξενίας) was a Parrhasian (he was also called Xenias of Parrhasia) general who commanded mercenaries in the service of Cyrus the Younger. In 405 BC, he accompanied Cyrus to court along with 300 men, after he had been summoned there by his father, Darius Nothus. After the return of Cyrus to western Asia, Xenias commanded several garrisons for him in Ionia, and with the greater portion of these troops, 4,000 hoplites, he joined the prince in his expedition against Artaxerxes II, leaving behind only a sufficient number of men to guard the citadels. At Tarsus a large body of his soldiers and of those of Pasion of Megara deserted and joined Clearchus of Sparta. Cyrus having afterwards allowed the latter to retain them, Xenias and Pasion abandoned the army at Myriandus, and sailed away to Greece.

== See also ==
- Anabasis (Xenophon)
