= Sophaenetus =

Greek mercenary leader of the Ten Thousand

Sophaenetus (Ancient Greek: Σοφαίνετος, romanized: Sophainetos) was one of the leaders of the Ten Thousand, an army of Greek mercenaries in the service of Cyrus the Younger, in 401–400 BC. A native of Stymphalus, he was an older man when he recruited and led one thousand hoplites to join Cyrus. He led the army back to the Black Sea and from Trapezus to Cerasus by ship. At Cotyora, he was fined 10 minae for mishandling funds.

The main source for Sophaenetus' career is the Anabasis of Xenophon. Writing in the fifth century AD, Stephanus of Byzantium cites on four occasions a certain Anabasis Kyrou written by Sophaenetus. This is generally presumed to be the same person as mentioned by Xenophon. Stephanus cites him for the names of several places in Asia Minor. The Anabasis Kyrou is not attested outside of Stephanus. The lack of any reference to the work for several centuries after it would have been written is a difficult to explain and its authenticity has been questioned. Some modern scholars regard it as a late forgery, composed after the time of Plutarch. Panico Stylianou suggests that it may be a case of mistaken identity. Pieces of advice attributed to Sophaenetus entered the military handbooks and were misunderstood to refer to a book written by him.

Some scholars who accept the authenticity of the Anabasis Kyrou regard it as the probable source of those elements in Diodorus Siculus' account of the Ten Thousand in his Bibliotheca historica that cannot be found in Xenophon. If the latter are correct, Diodorus probably encountered the Anabasis Kyrou indirectly, through Ephorus and the Hellenica Oxyrhynchia. It has even been argued that Sophaenetus, as the senior officer, wrote his account before 385 BC, well before Xenophon, and that the latter wrote in response, even using Sophaenetus as a source. It has been suggested that it may have been outcompeted by the superior literary quality of Xenophon's Anabasis. By comparison, Ptolemy's account of Alexander the Great's campaigns is also lost, but was used by Arrian in his Anabasis of Alexander centuries after it was written.
