= Tamos (Egyptian admiral) =

Late 5th-century BC Egyptian mercenary admiral

Tamos (Ancient Greek: Ταμώς), was a mercenary Admiral from Memphis in Egypt, hired by Cyrus the Younger, during his campaign to claim the Persian Throne. It is not known if Tamos served in the entire campaign during 401 BC. Tamos led a fleet of 25 triremes as a backup to Cyrus's mercenary Ten Thousand hoplites and Persian troops.

Tamos was Cyrus's secondary admiral, his first being Pythagoras the Spartan, who led the first fleet of 35 triremes.

== Biography ==
Tamos's early life is mostly unknown. He first appears on record when he was called for by Cyrus. Tamos mostly acted as a terror commander, sailing his fleet to hostile areas, quelling unrest by his mere presence. Tamos first saw action when his fleet blockaded the city of Miletus when it allied itself with Artaxerxes II. He later piloted both fleets to join Cyrus.

== Personal life ==
Tamos is known to have a son named Glus (Γλοῦς), who was also an officer in Cyrus's army.
