= Ariaeus =

Persian Achaemenid general (fl. 401–394 BC)

- Died: 394 BC
- Service years: 401 BC
- Conflicts: Battle of Cunaxa

Ariaeus (fl. 401 BC – 394 BC) was a Persian general who fought alongside Cyrus the Younger at the Battle of Cunaxa and later was involved in the assassination of Tissaphernes.

== Life ==
Ariaeus appears in historic records in 401 BC, in Xenophon's description of the events leading up to the Battle of Cunaxa. Xenophon noted that he was a friend of Cyrus and was said to be attracted to young boys, which was why he was an intimate of the young Thessalian general Menon.

At the Battle of Cunaxa, he was Cyrus' second in command and commanded the left. According to Ctesias, he was alongside Cyrus, when Cyrus succeeded in wounding Artaxerxes, but this is unlikely. This would put him on the right alongside Cyrus, and Xenophon and Diodorus both agree he was on the left, which would have been some distance away.

As soon as Ariaeus discovered that Cyrus was slain in battle, he retreated with the surviving Persian troops. After the battle, he offered to wait and return with the surviving Greek soldiers. Clearchus, speaking on behalf of the Greek soldiers, who considered themselves the victors in the battle, sent him a message to offer him the throne of Persia, but he declined. The Greeks then met up with Ariaeus and his Persian troops and they both agreed not to betray each other, and Ariaeus promised to lead them safely out of Persia.

Subsequently, Tissaphernes, promising Artaxerxes he would destroy the Greek troops entirely, persuaded the king to come to terms with Ariaeus, if Ariaeus would help betray the Greeks. Tissaphernes met with Ariaeus and persuaded him to join him, and Tissaphernes and Ariaeus led the Greeks to believe that they and Artaxerxes were willing to make peace with them and lead them to safety. Clearchus, Menon and three other generals (Agis of Arcadia, Socrates of Achaea and Proxenus of Boetia) along with 20 officers and some 200 troops later met with Tissaphernes on apparently cordial terms.

At a given signal, the officers and as many of the troops as could be caught were killed and all the generals were captured. They were then taken to Artaxerxes and killed. Some of the surviving soldiers found their way to the Greek encampment and, in response to their news, the remaining Greeks started preparing to attack the Persians. Ariaeus was immediately sent to assuage the Greeks. Ariaeus told the Greeks that only Clearchus has been killed, for reason of treachery, and tried to persuade them to lay down their arms, which the Greeks were reluctant to do. The surviving Greeks eventually decided to leave the camp and find their way out of Persia and return to Greece. Ariaeus joined Tissaphernes in an unsuccessful pursuit of the Greeks.

Ariaeus is next recorded in 395 BC when he was involved in the assassination of Tissaphernes. Diodorus refers to him as a satrap, which is probably a mistake, since he appeared to be reporting to Tissaphernes, who was the satrap of Sardis at that time. Artaxerxes grew angry with Tissaphernes' incompetence in his battles with the Greeks, perhaps even suspecting him of betrayal, and ordered his vizier Tithraustes to kill him. Ariaeus was ordered to assist. So Ariaeus invited Tissaphernes to visit him at his residence in Colossae in Phrygia to discuss important business. Tissaphernes was unsuspicious, leaving behind his bodyguard. When he arrived, he set aside his sword and went into a bath. Ariaeus' men seized him there and sent him to Tithraustes by covered carriage, where he was soon after beheaded.

Tithraustes was given Tissaphernes' former satrapy of Sardis and when Tithraustes left to visit Artaxerxes in the late summer of 395 BC, he left Ariaeus and Passiphernes as generals in charge of Sardis. In the winter of 395-394 BC, Ariaeus was visited there by Spithridates, who may have been trying to interest him in joining in rebellion against the king. Xenophon says that Spithridates put his trust in Ariaeus because he had already revolted against the king, which could have been a reference to Ariaeus' involvement in Cyrus the Younger's rebellion against Artaxerxes in 401 BC or perhaps may have suggested that Ariaeus was again in open rebellion.

== Primary sources ==
Diodorus Siculus, Bibliotheca historica XIV.26.1-5 & XIV.80.6-8
Hellenica Oxyrhynchia 19(22).3
Plutarch Life of Artaxerxes
Polyaenus, Stratagems of War VIII, 16
Xenophon, Anabasis I.8-II.6 & III.5; Hellenica IV.1.27

== Secondary sources ==
Bassett, Sherylee R. "Innocent Victims or Perjurers Betrayed? The Arrest of the Generals in Xenophon's 'Anabasis,'" The Classical Quarterly, New Series, 52: 2 (2002) pp 447–461
Bigwood, J. M. "The Ancient Accounts of the Battle of Cunaxa," The American Journal of Philology, Vol. 104, No. 4 (Winter, 1983), pp. 340–357
Brown, Truesdell S. "Menon of Thessaly" Historia: Zeitschrift für Alte Geschichte, 35:4 (1986) pp 387–404
Bruce, I. A. F. An Historical Commentary on the "Hellenica Oxyrhynchia," Cambridge UP, 1967, p 92
Cambridge Ancient History, Vol 6: The Fourth Century BC, Cambridge UP, 1994, pp 71 & 78-79
Dandamaev, M.A. A Political History of the Achaemenid Empire, Trans. W.J. Vogelsang, Brill, 1989
Dictionary of Greek and Roman Biography and Mythology, Ed. William Smith.
Grote, George. History of Greece, vol 9, 1856
Peter Krentz, Xenophon: Hellenika II.3.11-IV.2.8, Warminster: Aris & Phillips, 1995, p 206
Westlake, H. D. "Diodorus and the Expedition of Cyrus," Phoenix, Vol. 41, No. 3 (Autumn, 1987), pp. 241–254
