= Xenias of Elis =

Xenias (Ancient Greek: Ξενίας) was an Elean of great wealth, who was a proxenos of Sparta, and was also connected by private ties of hospitality to King Agis II.

In 400 BC, during the war between Sparta and Elis, Xenias and his oligarchical partisans made an attempt to overcome their adversaries by force, and to subject their country to the Spartans. Sallying out into the streets, they murdered several of their opponents, and among them a man whom they mistook for Thrasydaeus, the leader of the democratic party. Thrasydaeus of Elis, however, who had fallen asleep under the influence of wine, soon rallied his friends, defeated the oligarchs in a battle, and drove Xenias into exile.
