= Ctesias =

Fifth-century BC Greek physician and historian

Ctesias (/ˈtiːʒəs/ TEE-zhəs; Ancient Greek: Κτησίᾱς, romanized: Ktēsíās; fl. 5th century BC), also known as Ctesias of Cnidus, was a Greek physician and historian from the town of Cnidus in Caria, then part of the Achaemenid Empire.

== Historical events ==
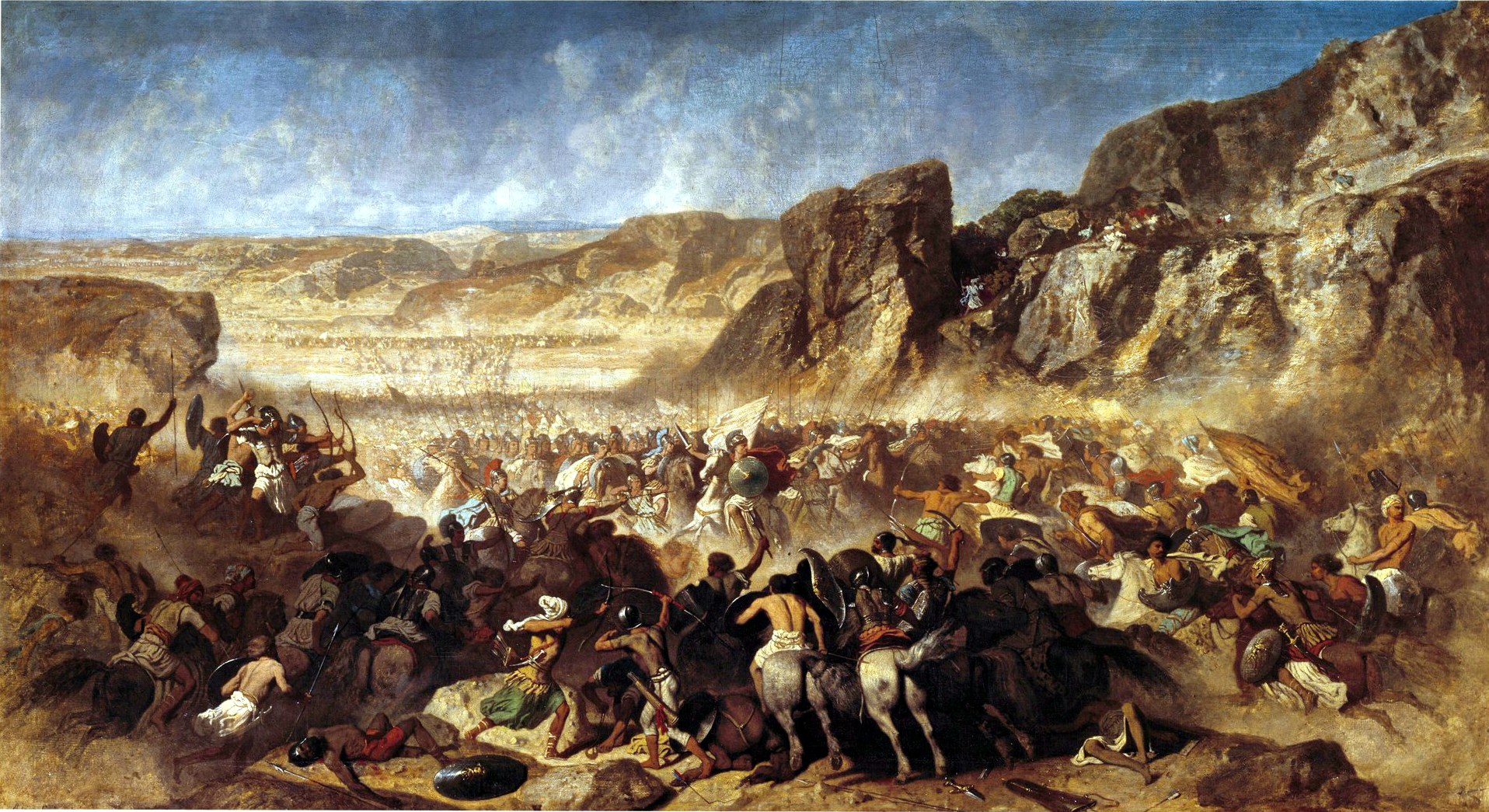
Ctesias attended to Artaxerxes II at the Battle of Cunaxa in 401 BC (depiction of the battle by Jean Adrien Guignet)

Ctesias was physician to the Achaemenid king, Artaxerxes II, whom he accompanied in 401 BC on his expedition against his brother Cyrus the Younger. Ctesias was part of the entourage of King Artaxerxes at the Battle of Cunaxa (401 BC) against Cyrus the Younger and his Greek mercenaries called the Ten Thousand, when Ctesias provided medical assistance to the king by treating his flesh wound. He reportedly was involved in negotiations with the Greeks after the battle. He also helped their Spartan general Clearchus before his execution at the royal court at Babylon.

Ctesias was the author of treatises on rivers and on the Persian revenues, as well as an account of India, Indica (Ἰνδικά), and of a history of Assyria and Persia in 23 books, Persica (Περσικά), drawn from documents in the Persian Royal Archives, written in opposition to Herodotus, in the Ionic dialect.

== Persica ==
The first six books of Persica cover the history of Assyria and Babylon to the foundation of the Persian empire in 550 BC by Cyrus the Great; the remaining 17 books cover the years to 398 BC. Of the two histories, abridgments by Photius and fragments are preserved by Athenaeus, Plutarch, Nicolaus of Damascus, and especially Diodorus Siculus, whose second book is derived mainly from Ctesias. As to the worth of Persica, much controversy occurred, both in ancient and modern times. Although many ancient authorities valued the work highly and used it to discredit Herodotus, a modern author writes, "(Ctesias's) unreliability makes Herodotus seem a model of accuracy." Reportedly, Ctesias's account of the Assyrian kings does not reconcile with the cuneiform evidence. The satirist Lucian thought so little of the historical reliability of Ctesias that in his satirical novella True Story he places Ctesias on an island where the evil were punished. Lucian wrote, "The people who suffered the greatest torment were those who had told lies when they were alive and written mendacious histories; among them were Ctesias of Cnidus, Herodotus, and many others."

According to the Encyclopædia Britannica, Ctesias mentioned that the grave of Darius I at Persepolis was in a cliff face that could be reached with an apparatus of ropes.

== Indica ==
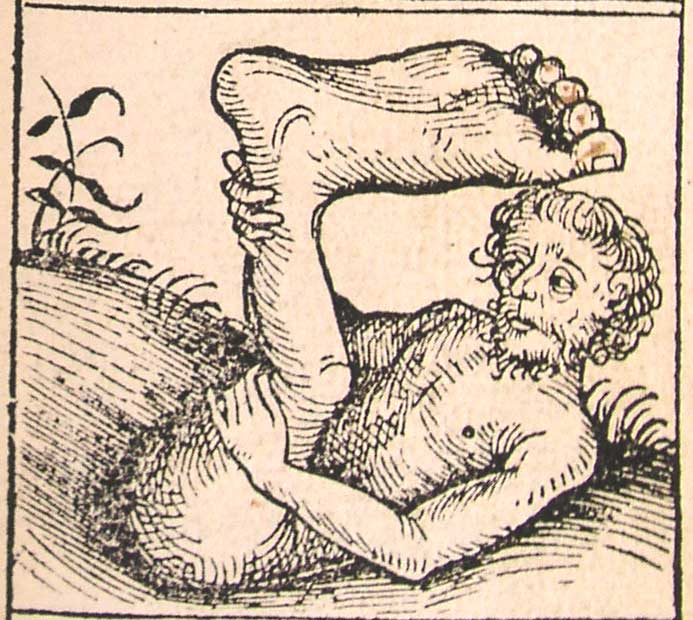
Some absurd claims form part of Indica, such as the stories of a race of people with only one leg, or with feet so big they could be used as an umbrella.

A record of the view that the Persians held of India was written by Ctesias under the title Indica. It includes descriptions of artisans, philosophers, and people having the qualities of deities, as well as accounts of unquantifiable gold, among other riches and wonders. The work is based on testimonials from the travellers to Persia rather than on personal observation. The work is marginally geographical, and focuses more on wonders, climate, flora, customs, diet etc. Modern view situates it between fact and fiction. Among the topographical observations found in the work are facts that the Indus River varies between 40 and 200 stades (5–25 miles), that the population of "India" (mostly northwest Indian subcontinent) almost exceeds the rest of the inhabited world, and that territorially "India" makes up half of Asia.

The book only remains in fragments and in reports made about the book by later authors.
