= Hydarnes (father of Stateira) =

Late 5th-century BC Persian nobleman

Hydarnes (Old Persian: 𐎻𐎡𐎭𐎼𐎴, romanized: Vidṛna), also known as Idernes, was a Persian nobleman, who was active during the reign of Darius II (r. 423 – 404 BC). He was a descendant (perhaps grandson) of Hydarnes the Younger, who was himself the son of Hydarnes, one of the seven Persian conspirators who overthrew the Pseudo-Smerdis. He was the father of several children through his principal consort. His offspring included Tissaphernes, Terituchmes, Stateira, Rhoxane, and two further daughters.

== Sources ==
- Bivar, A. D. H. (2002). "Gorgān v. Pre-Islamic history". In Yarshater, Ehsan (ed.). Encyclopædia Iranica. Vol. XI/2: Golšani–Great Britain IV. London and New York: Routledge & Kegan Paul. pp. 151–153. ISBN 978-0-933273-62-7.
- Briant, Pierre (2002). From Cyrus to Alexander: A History of the Persian Empire. Eisenbrauns. ISBN 978-1575060316.
- Lewis, Sian (2006). Ancient Tyranny. Edinburgh University Press. ISBN 978-0748621255.
- Llewellyn-Jones, Lloyd (2022). "Blood Brothers". Persians: The Age of the Great Kings. London: Headline Publishing Group. ISBN 978-1-5416-0035-5.
- Schmitt, Rüdiger (2004). "Hydarnes". In Yarshater, Ehsan (ed.). Encyclopædia Iranica. Vol. XII/6: Human migration II–Illuminationism. London and New York: Routledge & Kegan Paul. pp. 588–590. ISBN 978-0-933273-80-1.
- Waters, Matt (2017). Ctesias' Persica in Its Near Eastern Context. University of Wisconsin Pres. ISBN 978-0299310905.
