= Tissaphernes =

Persian Satrap of Lydia and Ionia (445–395 BC)

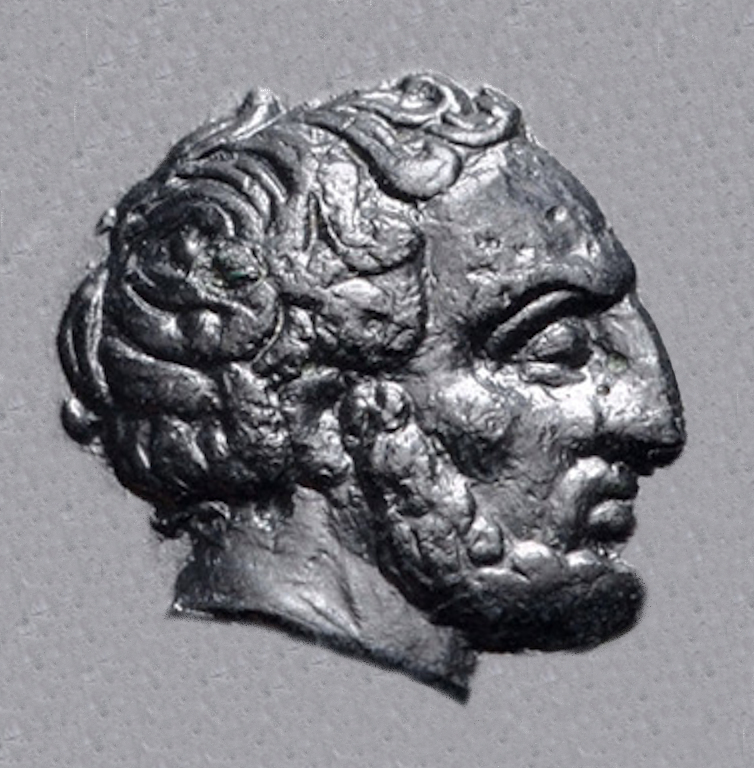
- Portrait of Tissaphernes (445 BC–395 BC), from his coinage. Most of his coins are inscribed ΤΙΣΣΑ ("TISSA") in Greek under his portrait, permitting identification.

Satrap of Lydia
- In office 415 BC – 408 BC
- Preceded by: Pissuthnes
- Succeeded by: Cyrus the Younger
- In office 400 BC – 395 BC
- Preceded by: Cyrus the Younger
- Succeeded by: Tiribazus

Personal details
- Born: 445 BC
- Died: 395 BC (aged 50) Colossae, Phrygia, Persian Empire (modern-day Honaz, Denizli, Turkey)

Military service
- Allegiance: Achaemenid Empire
- Battles/wars: Battle of Cunaxa

Tissaphernes (Old Persian: *Ciçafarnāʰ; Ancient Greek: Τισσαφέρνης; Lycian: 𐊋𐊆𐊈𐊈𐊀𐊓𐊕𐊑𐊏𐊀 Kizzaprñna, 𐊈𐊆𐊖𐊀𐊓𐊕𐊑𐊏𐊀 Zisaprñna; 445 – 395 BC) was a Persian commander and statesman, satrap of Lydia and Ionia. His life is mostly known from the works of Thucydides and Xenophon. According to Ctesias, he was the son of Hidarnes III and therefore, the great grandson of Hydarnes, one of the six conspirators who had supported the rise of Darius the Great.

== Etymology ==
Čiçafarnah (čiça + farnah) "with shining splendor": čiça is from the Proto-Indo-European adjective (s)koitrós 'bright'; farnah is equivalent to Avestan xvarənah 'fortune', 'glory', which appears as 'luminous'. čiθra means nature, specifically the animate nature.

Čiça- is the Old Persian form of the Old Iranian term Čiθra-, which is reflected in the Median form of the name, *Čiθrafarnah- (Ancient Greek: Τετραφέρνης).

== Family and early life ==
Tissaphernes was born in 445 BC. He belonged to an important Persian family: he was the grandson of Hydarnes, an eminent Persian general, who was the commander of the Immortals during the time of king Xerxes's invasion of Greece. His sister, Stateira, would become Queen-Consort for Artaxerxes II. His brother, Terituchmes, succeeded his father as satrap of Hyrcania.

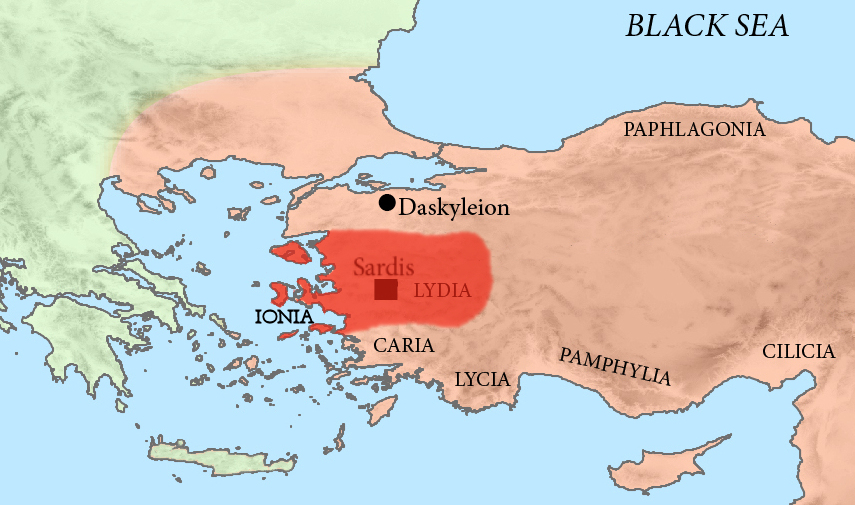
Tissaphernes was Satrap of Lydia, including Ionia, under the Achaemenid Empire.

In 414 BC, Tissaphernes was assigned by Darius II to suppress the rebellion of Pissuthnes, the Persian satrap of Lydia and Ionia, and to take over his office. Tissaphernes bribed Pissuthnes's Greek mercenaries to desert him and promised that his life would be spared if he surrendered, a promise which Darius did not keep. When Darius II ordered Tissaphernes to proceed to suppress the continued rebellion of Pissuthnes's son Amorges, and also ordered him to collect the outstanding tribute from the Greek cities of Asia Minor, many of which were under Athenian protection, Tissaphernes entered into an alliance with Sparta against Athens, which in 412 BC led to the Persian conquest of the greater part of Ionia.

However, Tissaphernes was unwilling to take action and tried to achieve his aim through astute and often perfidious negotiations. Alcibiades persuaded him that Persia's best policy was to keep the balance between Athens and Sparta, and rivalry with his neighbour Pharnabazus of Hellespontic Phrygia still further lessened his willingness to act against the Greeks. When, therefore, in 408 BC the king decided to actively support Sparta, Tissaphernes was removed as a general and his responsibilities were limited to the satrapy of Caria, with Lydia and the conduct of the war being entrusted to Cyrus the Younger.

== Civil war ==
On the death of Darius II in 404 BC, Artaxerxes II was crowned king of Persia. Tissaphernes, who found out about Cyrus the Younger's plan to assassinate his brother, informed the king about the conspiracy, who then had Cyrus imprisoned. But by the intercession of his mother Parysatis, Cyrus was pardoned and sent back to his satrapy. According to Plutarch, "his resentment for [his arrest] made him more eagerly desirous of the kingdom than before."

With the desire for revenge, Cyrus gathered a large army and pretended to prepare an expedition against the Pisidians, a tribe based in the Taurus mountains.

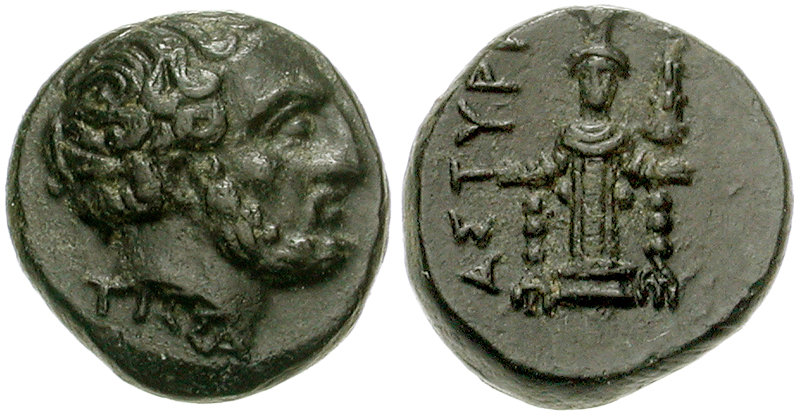
Coin of Tissaphernes, with ΤΙΣΣΑ ("TISSA") clearly visible below neck. Astyra, Mysia; c. 400–395 BC

In the spring of 401 BC, Cyrus united all his forces into an army, which now included Xenophon's "Ten Thousand", and advanced from Sardis without announcing the object of his expedition. By dexterous management and promises of large rewards, he overcame the misgivings of the Greek troops over the length and danger of the war. A Spartan fleet of 35 triremes sent to Cilicia opened the passes of the Amanus into Syria and a Spartan detachment of 700 men under Cheirisophus was conveyed to Cyrus. However, Tissaphernes managed to warn Artaxerxes II and quickly gathered together an army. Cyrus advanced into Babylonia before he met with any opposition. In October 401 BC, the Battle of Cunaxa ensued. Cyrus had 10,400 Greek hoplites (heavy-armed citizen-soldiers), 2,500 peltasts (light infantry) and an Asiatic army of approximately 10,000 under the command of Ariaeus.

Cyrus saw that the outcome depended on the fate of the king. He therefore wanted Clearchus of Sparta, the commander of the Greeks, to take the centre against Artaxerxes. Clearchus, out of arrogance, disobeyed. As a result, the left wing of the Persians under Tissaphernes was free to engage the rest of Cyrus's forces. Cyrus in the centre threw himself upon Artaxerxes, but was slain. Tissaphernes claimed to have killed the rebel himself.

The Greek soldiers of Cyrus, once they heard about the news of his death, realised that they were in the middle of a massive empire with no provisions, no one to finance them, and no reliable allies amongst the Persian nobles. They offered to make their Persian ally, Ariaeus, king, but he refused on the grounds that he was not of royal blood and so would not find enough support among the Persians to succeed. They then offered their services to Tissaphernes, but he refused. However, the Greeks refused to surrender to him.

Tissaphernes was left with a problem: he faced a large army of heavy troops that he could not defeat by frontal assault. He supplied them with food and, after a long wait, led them northwards for home, meanwhile detaching the Persian general Ariaeus and his light troops from the Greeks. The senior Greek officers foolishly accepted an invitation from Tissaphernes to attend a feast. There they were made prisoners, taken before the king, and decapitated. As a reward for his loyalty, Artaxerxes gave Tissaphernes one of his own daughters in marriage and restored him as governor of Lydia and as the commander-in-chief of the Persian army in Asia Minor.

== Later life and death ==
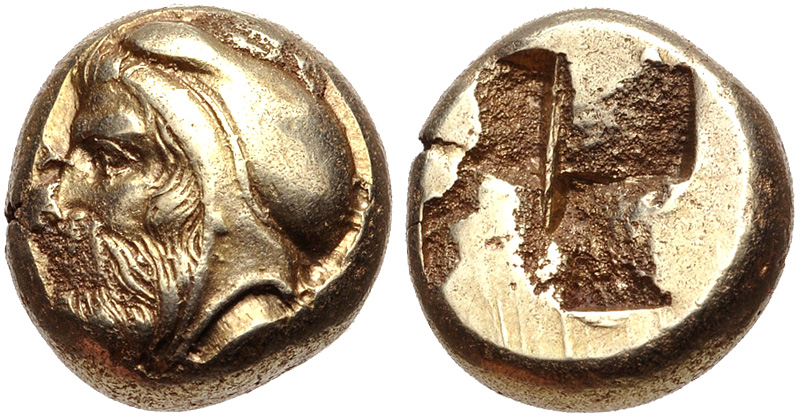
Coinage of Phokaia, Ionia, c. 478–387 BC; possible portrait of Satrap Tissaphernes, with satrapal headress, but since these coins have no markings, attribution remains uncertain

After returning to Asia Minor, Tissaphernes attacked the Greek cities to punish them for their allegiance to Cyrus. This led to a war with Sparta beginning in 399 BC. In 396 BC, the Spartan king and commander Agesilaus II led a campaign to free the Greek cities of Asia Minor. Tissaphernes at this point proposed an armistice and solemnly ratified a truce, which he instantly broke when Persian reinforcements arrived. Agesilaus thanked Tissaphernes for having put the gods on the side of the Greeks by committing perjury, and let it be known that he now planned to lead his troops against Caria. When Tissaphernes gathered his troops to meet this supposed Carian invasion, Agesilaus instead successfully attacked the Persian province of Hellespontine Phrygia. In 395 BC, Agesilaus let it be known that his next target would be the rich land around the Lydian city of Sardis. Tissaphernes, believing that if Agesilaus really intended to attack Sardis he would not have said so, assumed that this time Agesilaus would finally attack Caria, so Tissaphernes concentrated his troops in that area, but Agesilaus successfully attacked Sardis just as he said he would.

At last, the fall of Tissaphernes came about when the Persian king yielded to the representations of Pharnabazus II, strongly supported by the chiliarch (vizier) Tithraustes and by the queen-mother Parysatis, who hated Tissaphernes as the principal cause of the death of her favourite son Cyrus. Tithraustes was sent to assassinate Tissaphernes, who was lured to Ariaeus's residence in Colossae and slain in 395 BC.

== Legacy ==
Encyclopædia Iranica comments that:

Tissaphernes has been described, on the one hand, as impetuous and forthright, on the other, as a liar and treacherous deceiver (to Xenophon, he seemed "the supreme example of faithlessness and oath-breaking in the Anabasis"). Nevertheless, as one scholar has noted, "it is only fair to him to say ... that in an epoch when disloyalty was becoming the normal he remained the most loyal subject of the two Kings whom he served". That Tissaphernes appeared to the Greeks as one of their most dangerous enemies and no doubt the model of an unscrupulous diplomat is not surprising; this bias has so deeply marked Greek traditions that it now seems nearly impossible to form a balanced judgment about him, especially as no Persian sources are available and the pertinent sections of the Lycian Xanthos stele are not yet understood.

Following the death of Tissaphernes, Caria re-established a line of semi-independent local dynasts, still under the umbrella of the Achaemenid Empire, the dynasty of the Hecatomnids.

Tissaphernes plays a significant role in the biographical novel Alkibiades by Dutch author Ilja Leonard Pfeijffer. Because the novel is narrated by Alcibiades himself, the character of Tissaphernes is depicted along the lines of many Greek/Athenian perceptions of the Persians at that time.

== Sources ==
- Schmitt, Rüdiger (1991). "ČIΘRAFARNAH". Encyclopaedia Iranica, Online Edition.
