= Clearchus of Sparta =

5th century BCE Spartan general, initial commander of the ten thousand

Clearchus
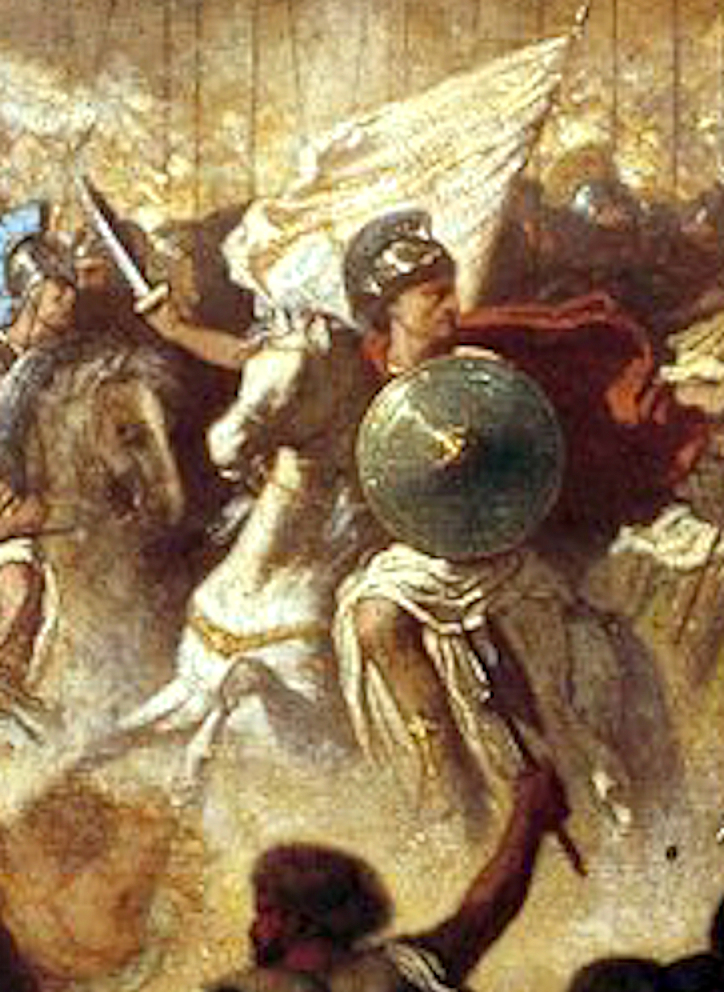
- Clearchus of Sparta at the 401 BC Battle of Cunaxa, by Adrien Guignet.
- Native name: Κλέαρχος
- Born: 450 BC; Sparta
- Died: 401 BC (aged 49) Babylon, Achaemenid Empire
- Allegiance: Sparta; Ten Thousand
- Rank: Strategos
- Conflicts: Peloponnesian War; Battle of Cyzicus; Battle of Arginusae; Battle of Cunaxa

Clearchus or Clearch (Ancient Greek: Κλέαρχος; 450 BC – 401 BC), also known as Clearchus the Lacedaemonian or Clearchus the son of Rhamphias, was a Spartan general and mercenary, noted for leading the Ten Thousand in battle against the Persian king.

== Biography ==
=== Peloponnesian War ===
Born about the middle of the 5th century BC, Clearchus was sent with a Spartan fleet to the Hellespont in 412 BC and took over Byzantium, in which he was made proxenos. He soon established a relationship with Pharnabazus II, the Persian satrap of Phrygia, and the two entered into a military alliance against the Athenians. He commanded the Spartan land forces at the Battle of Cyzicus in 410 BC, but he and his Persian allies were defeated. The Athenians were able to establish a base on the opposite coast of Byzantium, and began a naval blockade of the city along with conducting raids. Clearchus was given command of fifteen triremes with the goal of breaking through the blockade, and after being engaged by the Athenian navy, he was able to reach Byzantium after losing three ships. Byzantium was besieged and he travelled to Asia-Minor seeking money and more support from Pharnabazus. His severity and rationing of food for his soldiers, however, made him unpopular, and in his absence the gates were opened to the Athenians under Alcibiades. When he returned to Sparta, Clearchus was put on trial and fined for this loss.

He was present at the Battle of Arginusae and the Spartan commander Callicratidas claimed that if he died, Clearchus was most suited to take his place.

After the final defeat of Athens, Clearchus returned to Sparta and appealed to the ephors, asking to be given a force to settle the political dissensions then rife at Byzantium and to protect the city and the neighboring Greek colonies from Thracian attacks. He was granted that force, but when the ephors learned that the citizens of Byzantium considered him a tyrant, they recalled him through a messenger that reached Clearchus while he was still in the Isthmus of Corinth. Clearchus ignored the messenger and proceeded to Byzantium, and thus he was instantly declared an outlaw by the ephors. He fought the Thracian tribes successfully, in the process gaining the unofficial support of the Greek cities that were thus relieved. Clearchus, counting on his successes to gain him back the Spartan ephors' good graces, was ultimately disappointed in this expectation. After taking control of Byzantium, he ordered the execution of the chief magistrates, and had some of the wealthiest citizens strangled while he seized all their property. Sparta commanded him to leave Byzantium, but after he refused to, they sent an army to drive him out.

When Cyrus learned that a Greek force in high fighting condition was so near Asia, he sent ambassadors with money (10,000 Persian darics) asking Clearchus to help him claim the throne from his brother, the Persian Emperor Artaxerxes II Mnemon. Clearchus accepted not because of the money but because he knew that sooner or later he would have to face his fellow Spartans since he was still considered an outlaw by the ephors. He left the command of the garrison of Byzantium to Helixus of Megara (see Coeratadas).

=== The Ten Thousand ===
In the "Expedition of the Ten Thousand" undertaken by Cyrus to dethrone his brother Artaxerxes, Clearchus led the Peloponnesian contingent of the Ten Thousand, who formed the right wing of Cyrus's army at the Battle of Cunaxa (401 BC). He was instructed to attack the enemy center, but instead moved forward and pushed back the enemy's left wing, leaving Cyrus' flank vulnerable. Cyrus charged the enemy center and was killed in battle. On Cyrus's death Clearchus assumed the overall command of the Ten Thousand and conducted the retreat of the army, aiming to fall back to the Tigris river while parleying with the Persians. He was invited to a banquet by the satrap of Lydia and Ionia and general for Artaxerxes, Tissaphernes, but he and his party were arrested and sent to the royal court at Babylon, where he was executed on the orders of Queen Stateira.
