= Cyrus the Younger =

Achaemenid prince, satrap of Lydia from 408 to 401 BC

Cyrus the Younger 𐎤𐎢𐎽𐎢𐏁
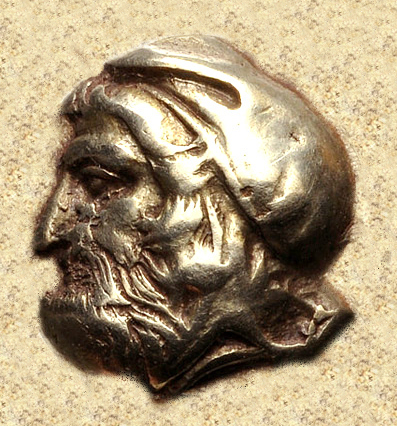
- Anonymous portrait of a satrap of Asia Minor, around the time of Cyrus the Younger. From a coin of Ionia, Phokaia, circa 478-387 BC.

Satrap of Lydia
- Reign: 408–401 BC
- Predecessor: Tissaphernes
- Successor: Tissaphernes
- Born: after 424 BC
- Died: 3 September, 401 BC
- Spouse: Aspasia of Phocaea
- Dynasty: Achaemenid
- Father: Darius II
- Mother: Parysatis
- Religion: Zoroastrianism

Cyrus the Younger (Old Persian: 𐎤𐎢𐎽𐎢𐏁 Kūruš; Ancient Greek: Κῦρος Kyros; died 401 BC), rarely called Cyrus III, was an Achaemenid prince and general. He ruled as satrap of Lydia and Ionia from 408 to 401 BC. Son of Darius II and Parysatis, he died in 401 BC in the Battle of Cunaxa during a failed attempt to oust his elder brother Artaxerxes II from the Persian throne.

The history of Cyrus and of the retreat of his Greek mercenaries is told by Xenophon in his Anabasis. Another account, probably from Sophaenetus of Stymphalus, was used by Ephorus. Further information is contained in the excerpts from Artaxerxes II's physician, Ctesias, by Photius; Plutarch’s Lives of Artaxerxes II and Lysander; and Thucydides's History of Peloponnesian War. These are the only early sources of information on Cyrus the Younger.

== Early life, family and education ==
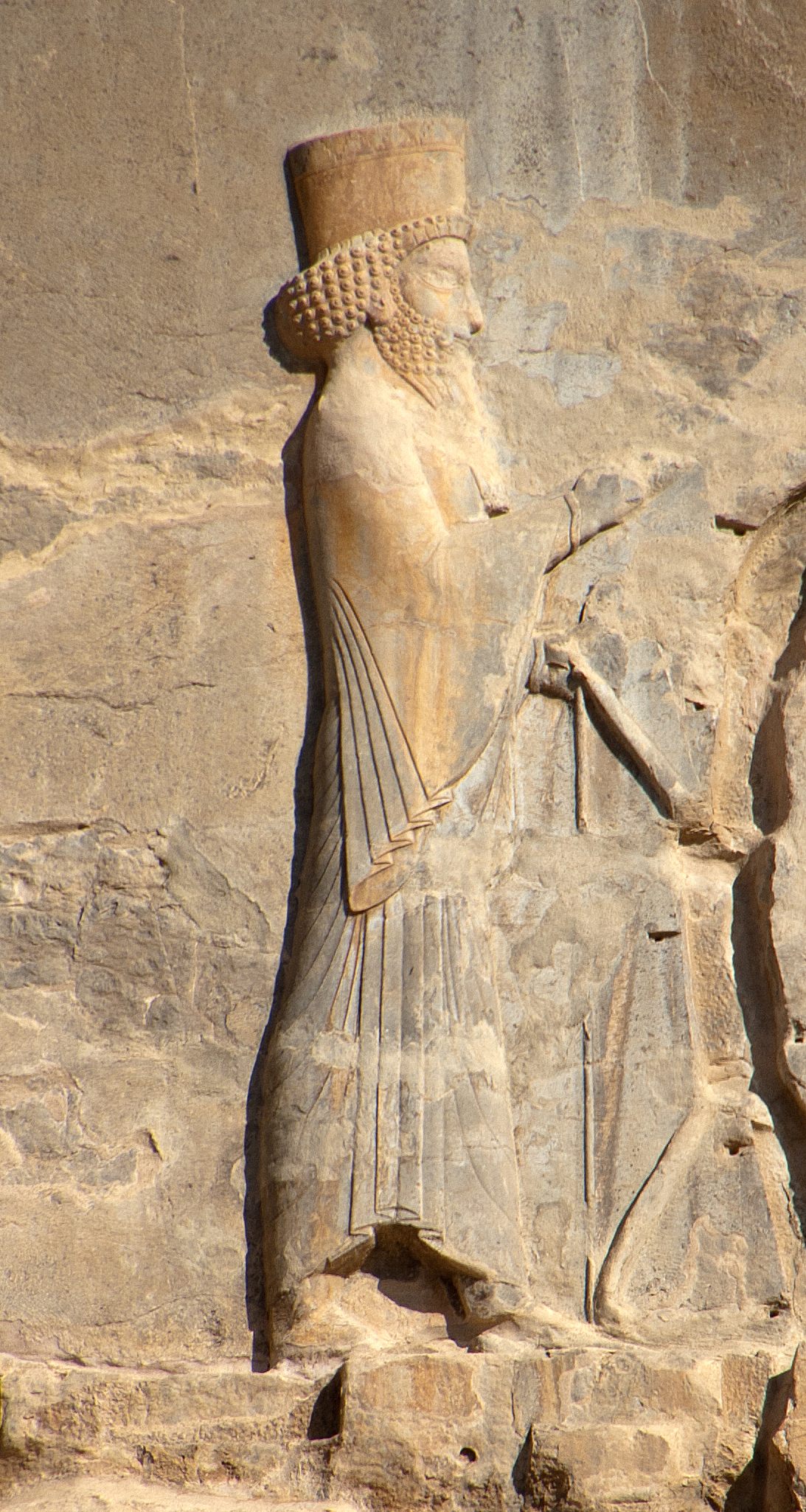
Relief depicting Artaxerxes II, from his tomb at Naqsh-e Rostam, Persepolis

According to Xenophon, Cyrus the Younger was born after the accession of his father in 424 BC. He had an elder brother, Arsicas (whose name changed to Artaxerxes II when he ascended the throne), and two younger brothers named Ostanes and Oxathres. About Cyrus's childhood, Plutarch wrote, "Cyrus, from his earliest youth, showed something of a headstrong and vehement character; Artaxerxes, on the other side, was gentler in everything, and of a nature more yielding and soft in its action." Xenophon spoke more highly of Cyrus's excellence as a youth:

In this courtly training Cyrus earned a double reputation; first he was held to be a paragon of modesty among his fellows, rendering an obedience to his elders which exceeded that of many of his own inferiors; and next he bore away the palm for skill in horsemanship and for love of the animal itself. Nor less in matters of war, in the use of the bow and the javelin, was he held by men in general to be at once the aptest of learners and the most eager practiser. As soon as his age permitted, the same pre-eminence showed itself in his fondness for the chase, not without a certain appetite for perilous adventure in facing the wild beasts themselves. Once a bear made a furious rush at him, and without wincing he grappled with her, and was pulled from his horse, receiving wounds the scars of which were visible through life; but in the end he slew the creature, nor did he forget him who first came to his aid, but made him enviable in the eyes of many.

== Satrap of Asia Minor (408-401 BC) and support for Sparta ==
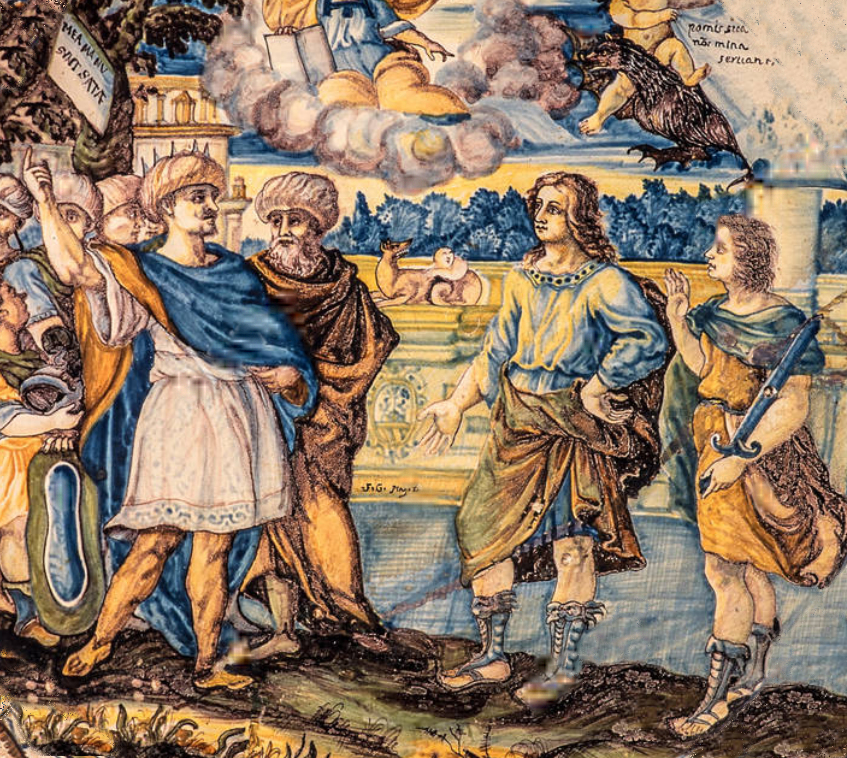
Meeting between Cyrus the Younger and Spartan general Lysander in Sardis. The encounter was related by Xenophon. Maiolica decoration by Francesco Antonio Grue (1686–1746).

In 408 BC, after the victories of Alcibiades leading to an Athenian resurgence, Darius II decided to continue the war against Athens and give strong support to the Spartans. He sent Cyrus the Younger into Asia Minor as satrap of Lydia and Phrygia Major with Cappadocia, and commander of the Persian troops, "which gather into the field of Castolos", which meant "of the army of the district of Asia Minor." At this time, Cyrus was also given the title of karanos (Old Iranian: *Karana), which greatly expanded his authority both politically and militarily, and allowed him to become largely autonomous. In Asia Minor, Cyrus met the Spartan general Lysander. In him, Cyrus found a man who was willing to help him become king, just as Lysander himself hoped to become absolute ruler of Greece by the aid of the Persian prince. Thus, Cyrus put all his means at the disposal of Lysander in the Peloponnesian War. When Cyrus was recalled to Susa by his father Darius, he gave Lysander the revenues from all of his cities of Asia Minor.

Around that time, Darius fell ill and called his son to his deathbed; Cyrus handed money over to Lysander and went to Susa. Plutarch wrote that Cyrus's mother, Parysatis, favored him and wanted him on the throne, "And therefore, his father Darius now lying ill, he, being sent for from the sea to the court, set out thence with full hopes that by her means he was to be declared the successor to the kingdom. For Parysatis had the specious plea in his behalf, which Xerxes on the advice of Demaratus had of old made use of, that she had borne him Arsicas when he was a subject, but Cyrus when a king. Notwithstanding, she prevailed not with Darius, but the eldest son Arsicas was proclaimed king, his name being changed into Artaxerxes; and Cyrus remained satrap of Lydia, and commander in the maritime provinces."

Soon after Darius died, around the time of Artaxerxes II's accession in 404 BC, Tissaphernes (Ciθrafarna) denounced Cyrus's plan to assassinate his brother, and Cyrus was captured, but by the intercession of Parysatis, Cyrus was pardoned and sent back to his satrapy. According to Plutarch, "his resentment for [his arrest] made him more eagerly desirous of the kingdom than before."

In 405 BC, Lysander won the battle of Aegospotami, and Sparta became more influential in the Greek world.

== Expedition against Artaxerxes II (401 BC) ==
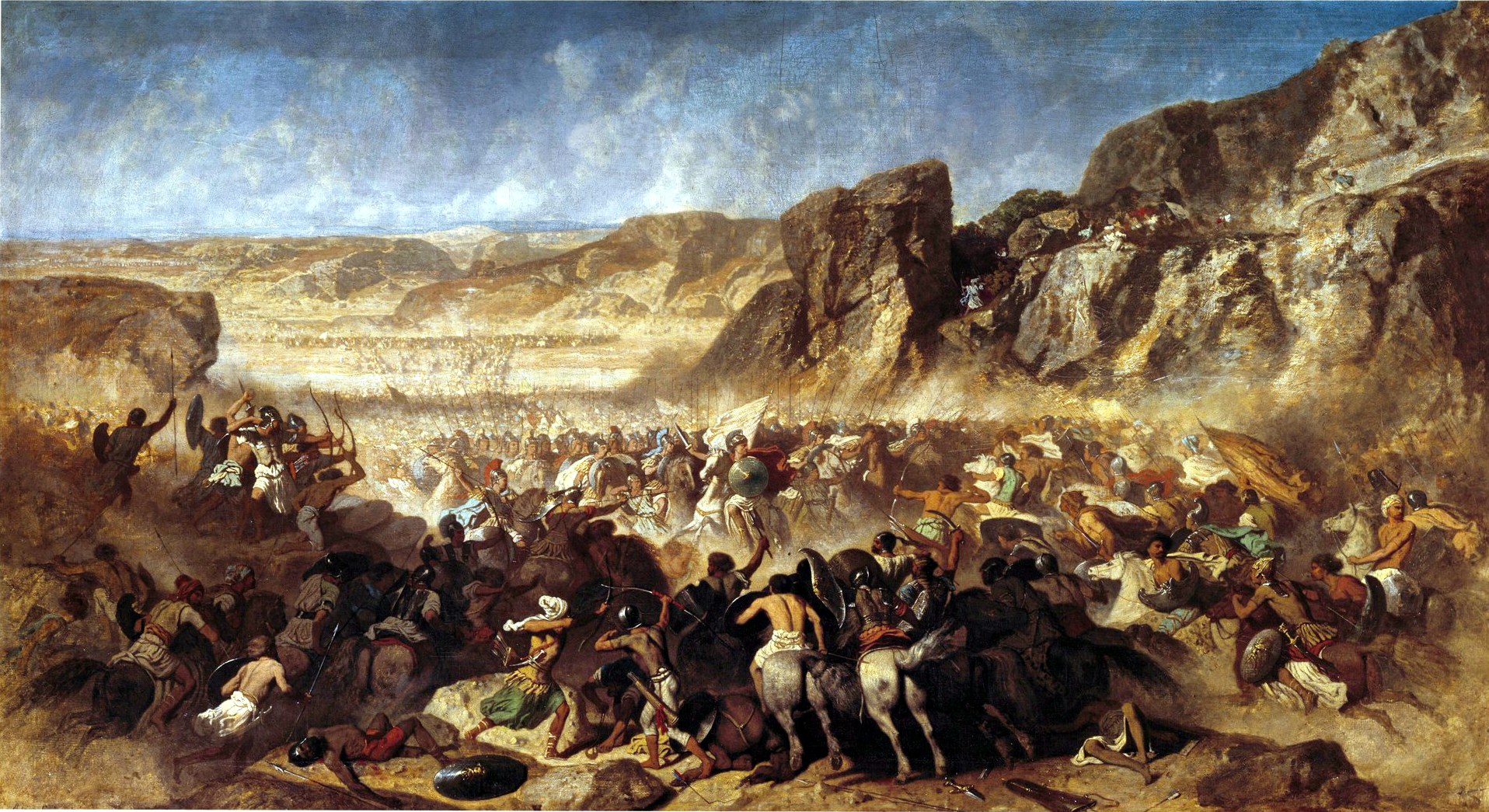
Jean-Adrien Guignet, Episode in the Retreat of the Ten Thousand (1842). The Greek mercenaries of Cyrus (the "Ten Thousand"), are shown being encircled.

Cyrus managed to gather a large army by beginning a quarrel with Tissaphernes, satrap of Caria, about the Ionian towns; he also pretended to prepare an expedition against the Pisidians, a mountainous tribe in the Taurus, which was never obedient to the Empire.

In the spring of 401 BC, Cyrus united all his forces into an army now including Xenophon's "Ten Thousand", and advanced from Sardis without announcing the object of his expedition. By dexterous management and large promises, he overcame the misgivings of the Greek troops over the length and danger of the war; a Spartan fleet of 35 triremes under the command of Pythagoras the Spartan sent to Cilicia opened the passes of the Amanus into Syria and conveyed to him a Spartan detachment of 700 men under Spartan General Cheirisophus. Cyrus the Younger had obtained the support of the Spartans after having asked them "to show themselves as good friend to him, as he had been to them during their war against Athens", in reference to the support he had given the Spartan in the Peloponnesian War against Athens a few years earlier.

The king had only been warned at the last moment by Tissaphernes and gathered an army in haste; Cyrus advanced into Babylonia before he met with an enemy. In October 401 BC, the battle of Cunaxa ensued. Cyrus had 10,400 Greek hoplites (citizen-soldiers), 2,500 peltasts (light infantry), and an Asiatic army of approximately 10,000 under the command of Ariaeus.

According to Xenophon, Cyrus saw that the outcome depended on the fate of the king; he therefore wanted Clearchus, the commander of the Greeks, to take the centre against Artaxerxes. Clearchus, afraid of the army's encirclement, disobeyed and remained on the flank. As a result, the left wing of the Persians under Tissaphernes was free to engage the rest of Cyrus's forces; Cyrus in the centre threw himself upon Artaxerxes but was slain. Tissaphernes claimed to have killed the rebel himself, and Parysatis later took vengeance upon the slayer of her favourite son.

According to Plutarch's Life of Artaxerxes, a young Persian soldier named Mithridates unknowingly struck Cyrus the Younger during the Battle of Cunaxa (Greek: Κούναξα), making him fall from his horse, dazed. Some eunuchs found Cyrus and tried to bring him to safety, but a Caunian among the king's camp followers struck a vein behind his knee with a dart, making him fall and strike his head on a stone, whereupon he died. Unwisely, Mithridates boasted of killing Cyrus in the court, and Parysatis had him executed by scaphism. She likewise got vengeance on Masabates, the king's eunuch, who had cut off Cyrus's hand and head, by winning him from her son Artaxerxes in a game of dice and having him flayed alive.

The Persian troops, instead of attacking the Greeks via a direct assault, decoyed them into the interior, beyond the Tigris, and then attacked through trickery. After their commanders had been taken prisoners, the Greeks managed to force their way to the Black Sea.

== Excerpts from Xenophon's account of Cyrus's life ==
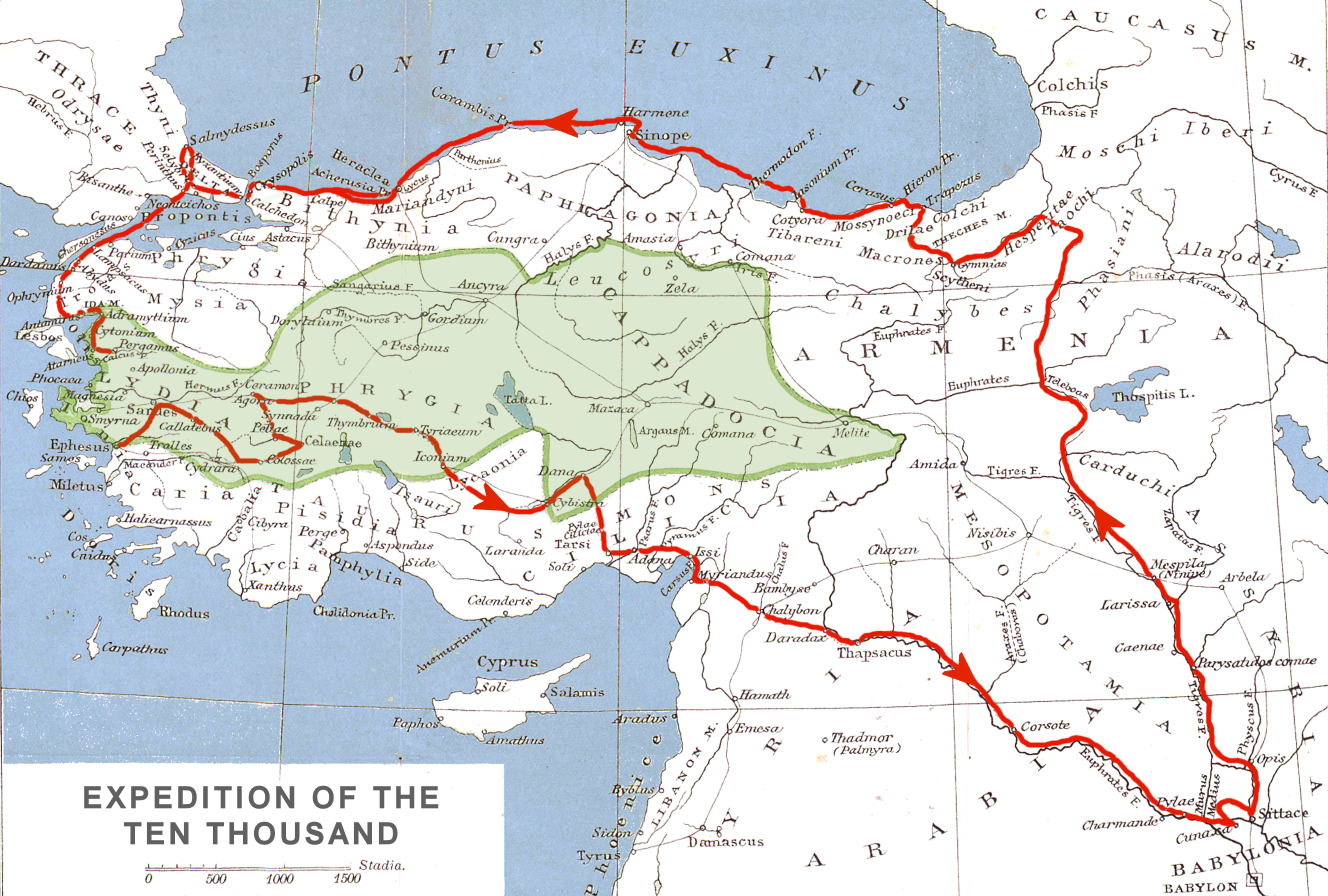
Route of Cyrus the Younger and the Ten Thousand mercenaries to Cunaxa, and return route of the Ten Thousand led by Xenophon, back to Byzantium, in red. The satrapy of Cyrus the Younger is delineated in green.

Xenophon wrote that all who knew Cyrus well considered him the most worthy of being king of all those born since Cyrus the Great and describes him with great praise:

After he had been sent down by his father to be satrap of Lydia and Great Phrygia and Cappadocia, and had been appointed general of the forces, whose business it is to muster in the plain of the Castolus, nothing was more noticeable in his conduct than the importance which he attached to the faithful fulfillment of every treaty or compact or undertaking entered into with others. He would tell no lies to any one. Thus doubtless it was that he won the confidence alike of individuals and of the communities entrusted to his care; or in case of hostility, a treaty made with Cyrus was a guarantee sufficient to the combatant that he would suffer nothing contrary to its terms. Therefore, in the war with Tissaphernes, all the states of their own accord chose Cyrus in lieu of Tissaphernes, except only the men of Miletus, and these were only alienated through fear of him, because he refused to abandon their exiled citizens; and his deeds and words bore emphatic witness to his principle: even if they were weakened in number or in fortune, he would never abandon those who had once become his friends. He made no secret of his endeavour to outdo his friends and his foes alike in reciprocity of conduct. The prayer has been attributed to him, "God grant I may live along enough to recompense my friends and requite my foes with a strong arm."

According to Xenophon, his efforts to reward uprightness earned Cyrus the loyalty and love of many followers:

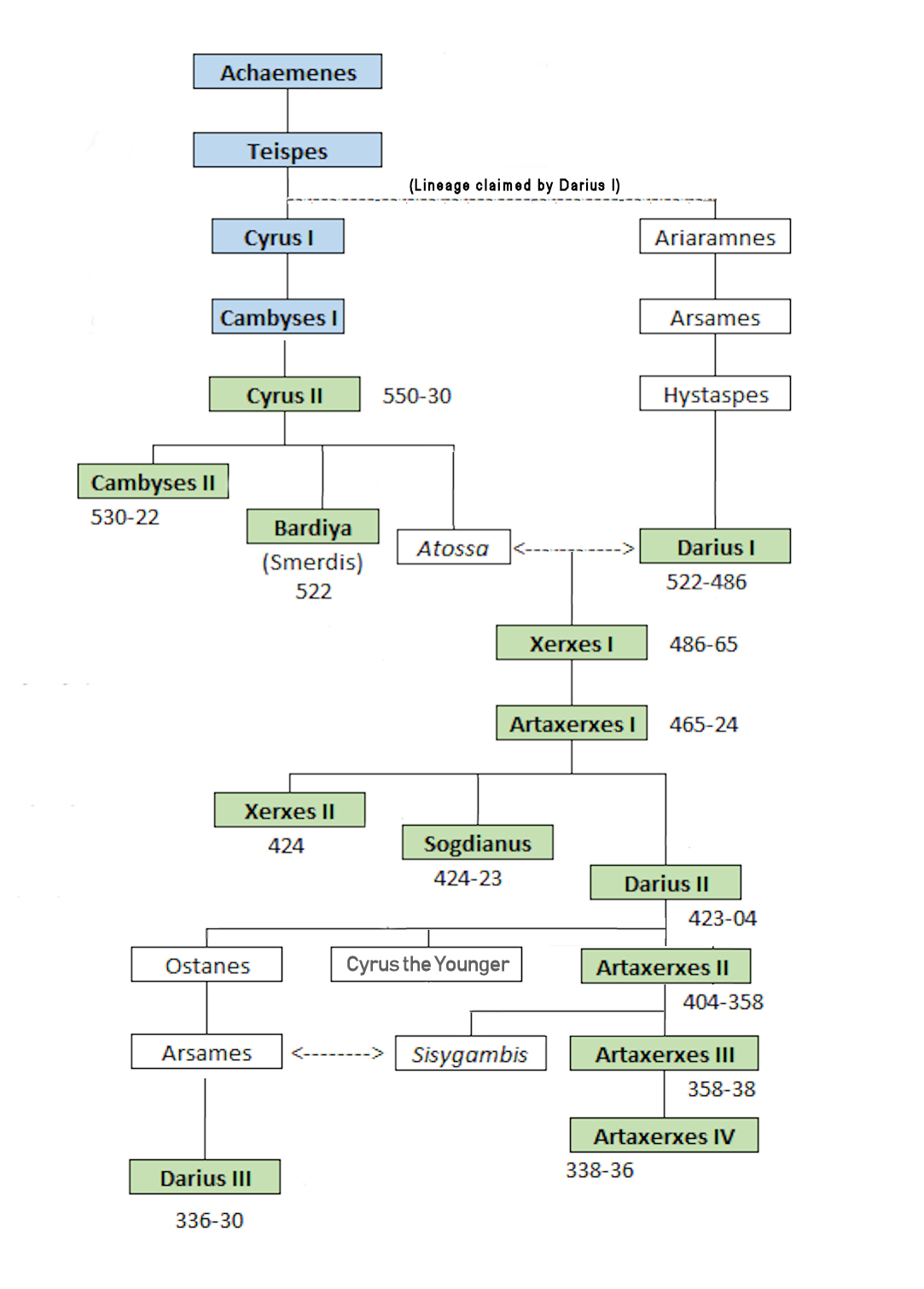
Cyrus the Younger in the Achaemenid lineage.

Many were the gifts bestowed on him, for many and diverse reasons; no one man, perhaps, ever received more; no one, certainly, was ever more ready to bestow them upon others, with an eye ever to the taste of each, so as to gratify what he saw to be the individual requirement. Many of these presents were sent to him to serve as personal adornments of the body or for battle; and as touching these he would say, "How am I to deck myself out in all these? To my mind a man's chief ornament is the adornment of nobly-adorned friends." .... Frequently when he had tasted some specially excellent wine, he would send the half remaining flagon to some friend with a message to say: "Cyrus says, this is the best wine he has tasted for a long time, that is his excuse for sending it to you. He hopes you will drink it up to-day with a choice party of friends." Or, perhaps, he would send the remainder of a dish of geese, half loaves of bread, and so forth, the bearer being instructed to say: "This is Cyrus's favourite dish, he hopes you will taste it yourself." Or, perhaps, there was a great dearth of provender, when, through the number of his servants and his own careful forethought, he was enabled to get supplies for himself; at such times he would send to his friends in different parts, bidding them feed their horses on his hay, since it would not do for the horses that carried his friends to go starving. Then, on any long march or expedition, where the crowd of lookers-on would be large, he would call his friends to him and entertain them with serious talk, as much as to say, "These I delight to honour."

== See also ==
- Anabasis
