= List of royal consorts of Iran =

Queen/Empress of Iran
- ملکه/شهبانوی ایران (Persian)
- Imperial
- Imperial arms of Empress Farah of Iran

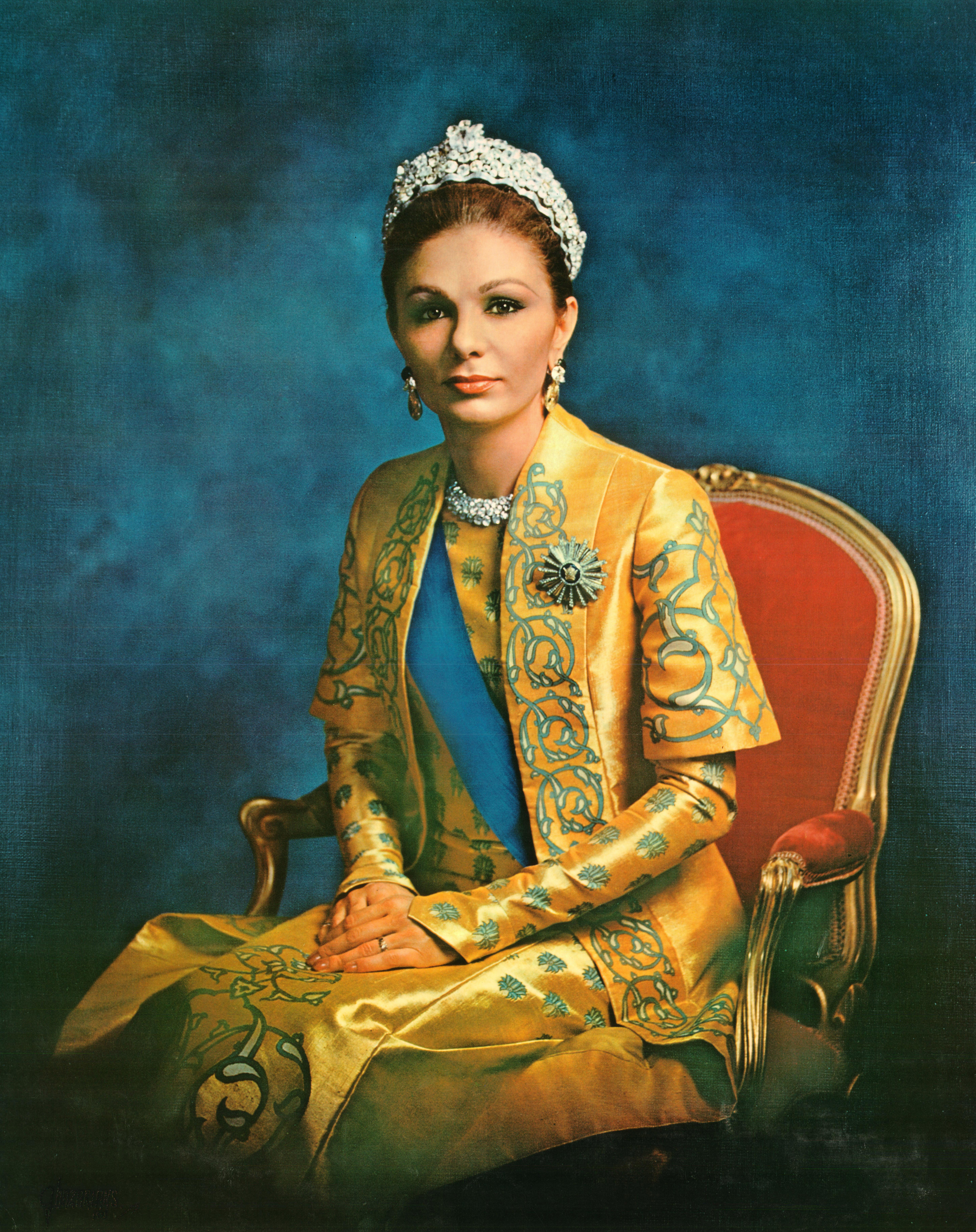
- Last in role: Farah Pahlavi; 21 December 1959 – 11 February 1979

Details
- Style: Shahbanu, Banbishn and various others
- Formed: c. 727 BC (Median dynasty) or 550 BC (Achaemenid dynasty)
- Abolished: 11 February 1979 (Iranian Revolution)
- Appointer: Shah of Iran

The royal consorts of Iran (Note: The exonym "Persia" was used by the ancient Greeks to refer to the Achaemenid Empire, derived from the Persians (the Iranian ethnic group to which the Achaemenid dynasty belonged). Historically, "Persia" was subsequently used in the Western world to refer to Iran and Iranians. "Iran" (Īrān, ایران) is the country's endonym, first attested under the Sasanian Empire as Ērān, though earlier forms of the name (see Aryan) date back to Proto-Indo-Iranian times and had been used ever since. In 1935, the Iranian monarch Reza Shah requested that foreign delegates begin using "Iran" rather than "Persia" in formal correspondence, whereafter "Iran" has also become the common name used internationally. See name of Iran for further details.) were the consorts of the rulers of the various states and civilizations in Iran (Persia) from antiquity until the abolition of the Iranian monarchy in the Iranian Revolution (1979). Certain titles were used for the female ruler or royal consort in certain dynasties, including Banbishn for the Sassanids and Shahbanu for the Pahlavis.

== Ancient Iran (c. 727 BC–AD 651) ==
=== Medes (c. 727–550 BC) ===
Portrait	Name	Monarch	Notes
	Aryenis	Astyages	

=== Achaemenid Empire (550–330 BC) ===
Portrait	Name	Monarch	Notes
	Cassandane	Cyrus II	
	Phaedymia	Cambyses II	
	Atossa	Cambyses II (disputed); Darius I	also a sister of Cambyses II.
	Artystone	Darius I	
	Parmys	Darius I	
	Amestris	Xerxes I	
	Damaspia	Artaxerxes I	
	Parysatis	Darius II	
	Stateira	Artaxerxes II	
	Amestris	Artaxerxes II	also a daughter of Artaxerxes II.
	Atossa	Artaxerxes III	
	Stateira	Darius III	

=== Hellenistic rule (331–129 BC) ===
==== Alexander's empire (331–305 BC) ====
Portrait	Name	Monarch	Notes
	Roxana	Alexander III	
	Stateira	Alexander III	
	Parysatis	Alexander III	
	Eurydice	Philip III	

==== Seleucid Empire (305–129 BC) ====
Portrait	Name	Monarch	Notes
	Apama	Seleucus I Nicator	
	Stratonice	Seleucus I Nicator; Antiochus I Soter	
	Laodice I	Antiochus II Theos	
	Berenice Syra	Antiochus II Theos	
	Laodice II	Seleucus II Callinicus	
	Laodice III	Antiochus III the Great	
	Laodice IV	Seleucus IV Philopator; Antiochus IV Epiphanes	
	Laodice V	Demetrius I Soter	
	Cleopatra Thea	Alexander Balas; Demetrius II Nicator; Antiochus VII Sidetes	
	Rhodogune	Demetrius II Nicator	

=== Parthian Empire (c. 250/247 BC–224 AD) ===
Portrait	Name	Monarch	Notes
	Rinnu	Mithridates I	
	Ariazate	Gotarzes I	
	Laodice	Orodes II	
	Musa	Phraates IV	later a queen regnant in her own right.

=== Sasanian Empire (224 AD–651 AD) ===
Portrait	Name	Monarch	Notes
	Denag	Ardashir I	also a sister of Ardashir I.
	Murrod	Ardashir I	
	Khwarranzem	Ardashir I or Shapur I	
	Shapurdukhtak I	Bahram II	
	Shapurdukhtak II	Narseh	
	Ifra Hormizd	Hormizd II	
	Yazdan-Friy Shapur	Shapur III	
	Shushandukht	Yazdegerd I	
	Denag	Yazdegerd II	
	Sambice	Kavad I	also a sister of Kavad I.
	Maria	Khosrow II	
	Shirin	Khosrow II	
	Gordiya	Khosrow II	
	Borandokht	Kavad II	also a sister of Kavad II; later a queen regnant in her own right.

== Medieval Iran (651–1501) ==
=== Arab (caliphal) rule (638–861) ===
==== Rashidun Caliphate (638–661) ====
Portrait	Name	Monarch	Notes
	Zaynab bint Maz'un	Umar	
	Atika bint Zayd	Umar	
	Umm Hakim bint al-Harith ibn Hisham	Umar	
	Umm Kulthum bint Ali	Umar	
	Na'ila bint al-Furafisa	Uthman	
	Umama bint Abi al-As	Ali	
	Umm al-Banin	Ali	
	Asma bint Umais	Ali	

==== Umayyad Caliphate (661–750) ====
Portrait	Name	Monarch	Notes
	Maysun	Mu'awiya I	
	Umm Khalid Fakhita	Yazid I	
	Fakhitah	Marwan I	
	Atikah	Abd al-Malik	
	Umm al-Banin	al-Walid I	
	Fatima	Umar ibn Abd al-Aziz	
	Umm Hakim	Hisham	
	Umm al-Hajjaj	Yazid II	

==== Abbasid Caliphate (749–861) ====
Portrait	Name	Monarch	Notes
	Umm Salama	Al-Saffah	
	Arwa	Al-Mansur	
	Fatimah	Al-Mansur	
	Rayta	Al-Mahdi	
	Al-Khayzuran	Al-Mahdi	
	Lubabah	Al-Hadi	
	Zubaidah	Harun al-Rashid	
	Umm Muhammad	Harun al-Rashid	
	Abbasa	Harun al-Rashid	
	Lubana	Al-Amin	
	Umm Isa	Al-Ma'mun	
	Buran	Al-Ma'mun	
	Faridah	Al-Mutawakkil	

==== Buyids (934–1062) ====
Portrait	Name	Monarch	Notes
	Sayyida Shirin	Fakhr al-Dawla	

=== Turco-Mongol rule (1038–1508) ===
==== Seljuk Empire (1038–1194) ====
Portrait	Name	Monarch	Notes
	Altun Jan Khatun	Tughril	
	Terken Khatun	Malik-Shah I	
	Zubayda Khatun	Malik-Shah I	
	Taj al-Din Khatun	Malik-Shah I	
	Gohar Khatun	Muhammad I Tapar	
	Terken Khatun	Ahmad Sanjar	

==== Khwarazmian Empire (1097–1220/1221) ====
Portrait	Name	Monarch	Notes
	Terken Khatun	Il-Arslan	
	Terken Khatun	Ala al-Din Tekish	

==== Mongol Empire (1220–1259) ====
Portrait	Name	Monarch	Notes
	Börte	Genghis Khan	
	Khulan Khatun	Genghis Khan	
	Yesugen	Genghis Khan	
	Yesui	Genghis Khan	
	Ibaqa Beki	Genghis Khan	
	Sorghaghtani Beki	Tolui	
	Möge Khatun	Ögedei Khan	
	Töregene Khatun	Ögedei Khan	
	Oghul Qaimish	Güyük Khan	

==== Ilkhanate (1256–1388) ====
Portrait	Name	Monarch	Notes
	Doquz Khatun	Hulagu Khan	
	Buluqhan Khatun	Abaqa Khan; Arghun Khan	
	Kököchin	Ghazan	
	Uljay Qutlugh Khatun	Abu Sa'id Bahadur Khan	
	Baghdad Khatun	Abu Sa'id Bahadur Khan	
	Dilshad Khatun	Abu Sa'id Bahadur Khan	

==== Timurid Empire (1370–1458) ====
Portrait	Name	Monarch	Notes
	Saray Mulk Khanum	Timur	
	Gawhar Shad	Shah Rukh	

==== Aq Qoyunlu (1465–1508) ====
Portrait	Name	Monarch	Notes
	Seljuk Shah Begum	Uzun Hasan	
	Despina Khatun	Uzun Hasan	
	Aynışah Sultan	Ahmad Beg	

== Modern Iran (1501–1979) ==
=== Safavid Iran (1501–1722) ===
Portrait	Name	Monarch	Notes
	Tajlu Khanum	Ismail I	
	Behruzeh Khanum	Ismail I	
	Sultanum Begum	Tahmasp I	
	Sultan-Agha Khanum	Tahmasp I	
	Khayr al-Nisa Begum	Mohammad Khodabanda	
	Yakhan Begum	Abbas I	
	Marta	Abbas I	
	Tamar Amilakhori	Abbas I	
	Anna Khanum	Safi	
	Nakihat Khanum	Abbas II	

=== Intermediate period (1722–1796) ===
==== Afsharids (1736–1796) ====
Portrait	Name	Monarch	Notes
	Razia Begum	Nader	

=== Qajar Iran (1789–1925) ===
Portrait	Name	Monarch	Notes
	Asiye Khanum Ezzeddin Qajar	Agha Mohammad	
	Maryam Khanom	Agha Mohammad; Fath-Ali	
	Badr Jahan Khanom	Fath-Ali	
	Asiya Khanom Devellu	Fath-Ali	
	Badralensa Khanum	Fath-Ali	
	Sonbol Baji	Fath-Ali	
	Taj ol-Dowleh	Fath-Ali	
	Golbadan Baji	Fath-Ali	
	Agha Baji Javanshir	Fath-Ali	
	Naneh Khanom Barforoush	Fath-Ali	
	Naneh Khanum Ostad	Fath-Ali	
	Moshtari Khanum	Fath-Ali	
	Begum Khanum	Fath-Ali	
	Malek Jahan Khanom	Mohammad	
	Galin Khanom	Naser al-Din	
	Taj al-Dawlah	Naser al-Din	
	Shokouh al-Saltaneh	Naser al-Din	
	Jeyran	Naser al-Din	
	Anis al-Dawla	Naser al-Din	
	Amina Aqdas	Naser al-Din	
	Khazen al-Dawlah	Naser al-Din	
	Monir al-Saltaneh	Naser al-Din	
	Fatemeh Soltan Baghbanbashi	Naser al-Din	
	Taj ol-Molouk	Mozaffar ad-Din	
	Sarvar al-Saltaneh	Mozaffar ad-Din	
	Malekeh Jahan	Mohammad Ali	
	Badr al-Molouk	Ahmad	

=== Pahlavi Iran (1925–1979) ===
Portrait	Name	Monarch	Notes
	Tadj ol-Molouk	Reza	
	Turan Amirsoleimani	Reza	
	Esmat Dowlatshahi	Reza	
	Fawzia bint Fuad	Mohammad Reza	
	Soraya Esfandiary-Bakhtiary	Mohammad Reza	
	Farah Diba	Mohammad Reza	

== See also ==
- List of monarchs of Iran
- List of ancient Persians\
- List of Iranian women royalty
- Monarchism in Iran
- Iranian National Jewels
