= Xwedodah =

Historical Zoroastrian consanguinious marriage

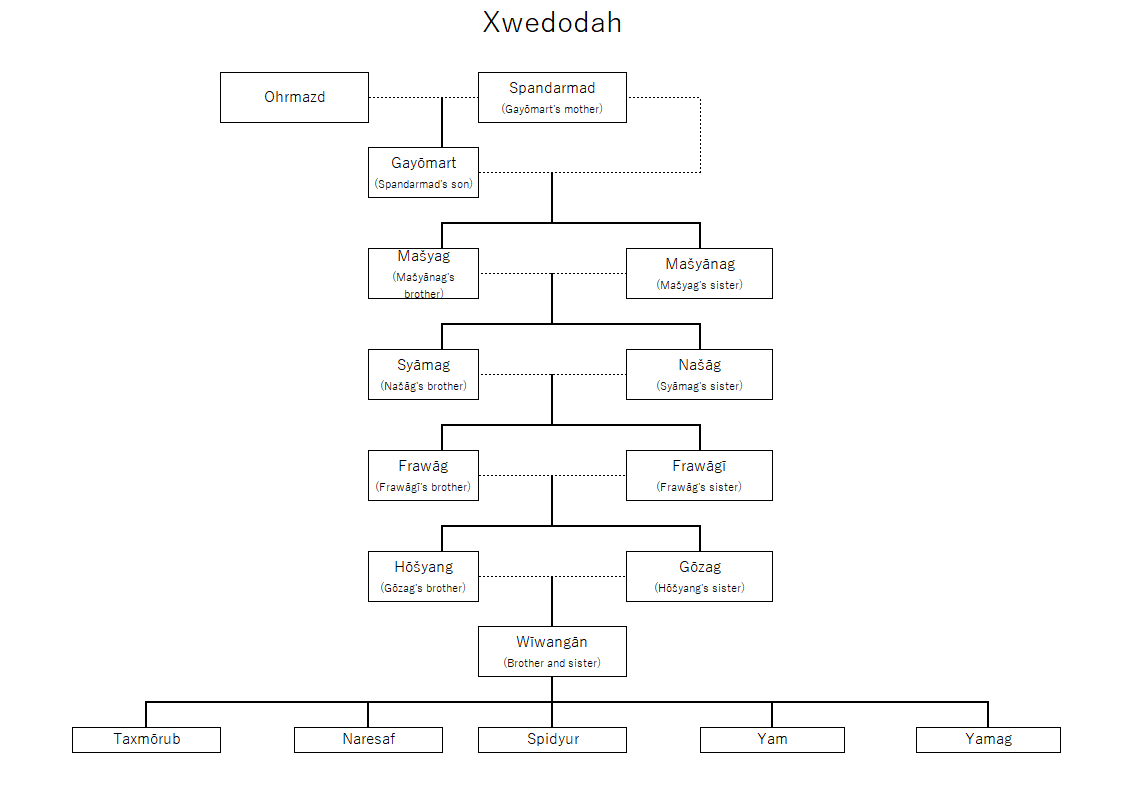
Family tree of the mythical Mashya and Mashyana and their descendants.

Xwedodah (Persian: خویدوده xidude; Avestan: xᵛaētuuadaθa) is a type of consanguine marriage historically practiced in Zoroastrianism before the Muslim conquest of Persia. Such marriages are recorded as having been inspired by Zoroastrian cosmogony and considered pious. It was believed to be a high act of worship in Zoroastrianism.

This form of direct familial incest marriage allowed Zoroastrians to marry their sisters. There are few examples that show xwedodah was practiced by royalty and nobility, and possibly clergy, but it is not known if it was commonly practiced by families in other classes. In modern Zoroastrianism it is near non-existent, having been noted to have disappeared as an extant practice by the 11th century.

== Etymology ==
While the Avestan term xᵛaētuuadaθa is still of ambiguous meaning and function in the Young Avestan texts, it is only later in Middle Persian that the term becomes used in its current form. The earliest use of the word Xwedodah is in Middle Persian in the Ka'ba-ye Zartosht inscription at Naqsh-e Rostam. The nineteenth-century qaêtvadatha style (with q instead of Avesta x) and similar writings reappear in modern literature.

The first part of the compound seems to be a "family" (or similar) of Khito (xᵛaētu), which is generally thought to derive from the "self" (xᵛaē-) with the suffix -you (-tu-), although this is not entirely straightforward. The second part, vadaθa, is nowadays generally regarded as a derivative of the verb (From * Wad-) 'resulting in marriage', related to other Iranian and Indo-European languages which refer to marriage or marriage partner (compare with ancient Indik). "Wife" Av. Vaδū; Pahlavi wayūg (Pers. Bayu) "bride"; Avestan vaδut "one who has reached the age of marriage"; Pahlavi wayūdag "bride's room".

This etymology was suggested by Carl Goldner, and accepted by Émile Benveniste and Christian Bartholomae, and became a popular opinion among Western scholars. However, there is no * vadha- to Vedic or * vada- root in the Avesta of the vadh root; in Avesta the vāδaya and upa.vāδaiia- 'lead (to marry)' and uzuuāδaiia are 'leaving the father's house'. vadh-Vedic, vad-Avestan should not be confused with vah-Avestan "to take", vaz-Avestan with the uhyá-unknown form.

== Sanctification of Xwedodah ==
In Zoroastrian traditions, it is said that Ahura Mazda created all Yazatas, therefore all Yazatas are considered spiritual children of Ahura Mazda. Spenta Armaiti, one of the Amesha Spenta, is also considered the consort of Ahura Mazda as queen of heaven and mother of earth. In one tradition in the sixth "Gāh" Keyumars, the first human, was created from mud on the left side of "Veh-Dāit" to help Ahura Mazda, and he was created in the form of a 15-year-old boy. In another tradition, Keyumars was the result of intercourse between Ahura Mazda and Armaiti, and she gave birth to Keyumars. In this tradition, it's also considered that Mashya and Mashyana are also children of Armaiti since she's Mother Earth, and not that Mashya and Mashyana are only the children of Keyumars.

== Zoroastrian religious sources ==
Most of Pahlavi's texts are self-contained by Edward William West's comments. Brief evaluations and references include Friedrich Spiegel and standard books on Zoroastrianism, such as Boyce.

=== Avestan ===
In the Old Avestan texts known as the Gathas, believed to have been written by the founder of the faith Zoroaster, Armaiti of the Amesha Spenta is referred to as the "daughter" of Ahura Mazda, the highest deity within Zoroastrianism. The Younger Avestan texts of the Yashts, in particular the Frawardin Yasht, mention that the relationship is less a literally familial one and instead one of unity of essence and nature with Ahura Mazda as "father and commander" of the group. In the youngest Avestan text, the Vendidad, the urine of sheep, oxen, and those who marry next-of-kin are viewed as being particularly pure and devoid of corruption by Ahriman and therefore able to be used by corpse-bearers to wash and purify themselves, however, it does not clarify the terms next-of-kin.

=== Pahlavi ===
Xwedodah became a more solidified doctrine in the Pahlavi/Middle Persian literature of post-Sassanian Zoroastrianism. In Zoroastrian cosmogony as explained by the Pahlavi text Bundahishn, Ahura Mazda is said to not have sired the other divine creations but rather to have fashioned or set them in their proper places and is referred to as both "mother", through spiritual nurturing, and "father", through material development, of all existence. The Denkard, which includes passages encouraging the action, and the Dadestan-i Denig both claim that not only was the world created through xwedodah, but humanity from the Consanguine marriage of Mashya and Mashyana, who were born from the spiritually-incestuous relationship of Keyumars (produced from xwedodah with Armaiti) and Spenta Armaiti, also developed from it to the pleasure of Ahura Mazda. In the third book of the Denkard, which consists of a collection of Wisdom literature that can at times contradict itself, regarding an inquiry whether it was appropriate to marry a Hebrew, xwedodah is referred to not as consanguine marriage but rather as marriage within the faith which is viewed as providing honor and strength to those who engage in it and can include incestuous relationships of various kinds. After discussing the mythological origins of the various forms of xwedodah, it expresses the following view on parent–child sexual relations in such societies:

It is (well) known that among some nations sexual congress with (ones) children is considered to be highly pleasurable and in accordance with religion, but the cause of this (custom) must necessarily be some inferior descendants of some person of a different race and of a perverse religion... therefore, this is an improper and incestuous marriage custom. If so, such a person has thereby no part in the prayers to the Self-existent and in the joy of heaven, but gives rise thereby to increased harm, and, while doing no benefit, is not of a pleasant aspect, and has many blemishes.

However, it does not say the same about relationships between siblings.

The Revayats, dating from the 1400s as a series of clerical communications, further solidify this broader view of xwedodah while encouraging the incestuous nature of it also noting that the practice had not been extant in centuries and the Shahnameh has it mentioned in passing. According to the revayats, the marriage between a mother and her son is the most superior type of xwedodah, followed by that of father and daughter, which is followed by that of brother and sister. The xwedodah becomes even more superior if the mother/daughter is also the half-sister of her son/father. In the book Wizidagiha-i Zadspram marriage between Next of kin is considered the best means of ensuring the purity of the lineage. In Shāyest nē Shāyest it is said that Ahura Mazda created three things to prevent Ahriman from harming humans, including marriage between next of kin.

== Non-Zoroastrian sources ==
There are 60 outside sources referencing Zoroastrian Persian brother-sister incest marriages come from the Greeks, Romans, Armenians, Arabians, Indians, Tibetans, and Chinese, ranging from the 5th century BC into the 15th century AD, roughly 2000 years. To maintain stability over a multicultural empire, the Islamic Caliphate allowed newly conquered territory to keep their customs and practices as long as they submitted and paid their taxes. Thus Zoroastrian brother-sister incest continued to persist and exist well into the Middle Ages.

=== Greco-Roman ===
Greek sources such as Xanthus of Lydia and Ctesias of Cnidus mentioned that the Magi priesthood have sexual and matrimonial relationships with their relatives while Herodotus states that before Cambyses I this was not a Persian practice. Roman poets Catullus and Ovid both included references to consanginous relationships in the Persian Empire and Quintus Curtius Rufus states in his histories that the Sogdian governor Sisimithres sired two sons with his own mother.

=== Jewish ===
Babylonian Jewish rabbis formulated a legal-theoretical interpretation in the Babylonian Talmud on sexual relationships between siblings, forbidden to Jews and permissible to Gentiles (non-Jews), in light of the Zoroastrian doctrine of xwedodah. Philo of Alexandria related that the products of a high-born incestuous relationship were themselves considered exaltation and noble, while the Babylonian Talmud notes cases in which situations comparable to xwedodah are both allowed and punishable but without direct mention of Zoroastrianism in the texts.

=== Islamic ===
Al-Tha'alibi writes that Zoroaster must have legalized marriage and made them Halal between brothers and sisters and fathers and daughters because Adam had married his sons to his daughters. Al-Masudi reported that Ardashir I told his people to marry close relatives to strengthen family ties. Abū Hayyān al-Tawhīdī declared the historical practice depraved, feebleminded, and deceptive in comparison to Arab practices and noted that it resulted in birth defects and was incorrectly declared a practice not done even by animals. Ibn al-Jawzi states in his Talbis al-Iblis that Zoroaster did preach these commandments which was then common between the parsis. Ferdowsi mentions incest between Bahman and his sister Homa.

=== Christian ===
Eusebius cites the Gnostic theologian Bardaisan who stated that the Persians brought the practice with them wherever they went and that the Magi priesthood still practiced it by his time while Pseudo-Clement and Basil of Caesarea both commented on the unlawfulness of such practices in comparison to Christian doctrine. Eznik of Kolb accused Zoroaster of having developed the doctrine due to his own desires to see it propagated among his people and Jerome attached the Persians amongst Ethiopians, Medians, and Indians as those who had intercourses with the female members of their families. The Synod of Beth Lapat had proclamations against Christians who imitated the practice of xwedodah with Patriarch Aba I, a convert from Zoroastrianism, championing the cause against the practice.

The most comprehensive reports come from Eastern Christians who lived under Persian rule, they wrote down that these were not just fictitious stories of far away people, but were indeed very real and widely practiced. Iso'bokht, the Nestorian patriarch of the Persis writes many books on this topic urging Christians and other peoples to not practice this custom.

=== Greek ===
The common feature of non-Iranian sources is that they rarely mention the Iranians themselves, even if they do occasionally mention the majus clerics. Numerous classical sources and later authors point to the practice of incest in the Achaemenid monarchies of the Parthian and Sassanian dynasties. Some of the earliest Greek references to non-royal incest are those by Xanthus in his book Magica, which Clement of Alexandria quoted as saying that Magi had sex with their mothers, daughters and sisters, and that Ctesias had mentioned a brother-sister marriage. Herodotus mentions that Cambyses lived with his sister.

=== Chinese ===
According to the Chinese traveller Du Huan (fl. 751–762), the religious law of Xun-xun, which refers to a non-Abrahamic religion in the middle east, likely Manichaeism, allowed clan members to intermarry. A reference can be found in the Pahlavi-Chinese bilingual tomb inscriptions in Xi'an, in which the deceased woman, from the Surin family princes, is read in Chinese as "wife" but in Pahlavi as "daughter".

== Examples ==
- Cambyses II, second king of the Achaemenid Empire, married his sister Atossa
- Artaxerxes II married two of his daughters, Amestris and Atossa
- Darius III married his sister Stateira
- The mythological king Kay Bahman is said in some narratives to have married his daughter Homai
- Helena and Monobaz I of Adiabene married each other despite being brother and sister. (The kingdom was majority-Zoroastrian though they converted to Judaism after their marriage.)

== See also ==
- Persian wedding
- Zoroastrianism

== Bibliography ==
- Wan, Lei (2017), The First Chinese Travel Record on the Arab World
- Sanjana, Darab Peshotan (1888). Next-of-kin Marriages in Old Irân – via Wikisource.
