= Tiridates =

Tiridates (Parthian: 𐭕𐭉𐭓𐭉𐭃𐭕, Tīridāt, Old Armenian: Տրդատ, Trdat) is a word of Iranian origin (“given by the god Tir”). It may refer to:

== Parthia ==
- Tiridates I of Parthia (fl. 211 BC), brother of Arsaces I
- Tiridates II of Parthia, ruled c. 30–26 BC
- Tiridates III of Parthia, ruled c. 35-36

== Armenia ==
- Tiridates I of Armenia, ruled c. 56-59 and 62-88
- Tiridates II of Armenia, ruled from 217 to 252
- Tiridates III of Armenia, ruled 287–330, also known as Tiridates the Great
- Tiridates (fl. 4th century), a prince from the Bagratuni dynasty, husband of the Arsacid Princess Eranyak
- Trdat the Architect (c. 950–1020), chief architect of the Bagratuni dynasty

== Others ==
- Tiridates (eunuch), favored eunuch of Artaxerxes II
- Tiridates (fl. 2nd century), a contemporary of Sohaemus of Armenia
- Trdat of Iberia, also known as Tiridates of Iberia, ruled c. 394-406
