= 888 Parysatis =

Main-belt asteroid

Discovery
- Discovered by: M. F. Wolf
- Discovery site: Heidelberg Obs.
- Discovery date: 2 February 1918

Designations
- Pronunciation: /pəˈrɪsətɪs/
- Named after: Queen Parysatis (Persian Queen)
- Alternative designations: A918 CE · A906 JA; A908 YL · A915 JD; 1915 JD · 1918 DC; 1906 JA · 1908 YL
- Minor planet category: main-belt · (middle) background

Orbital characteristics
- Epoch 31 May 2020 (JD 2459000.5)
- Uncertainty parameter 0
- Observation arc: 113.73 yr (41,539 d)
- Aphelion: 3.2357 AU
- Perihelion: 2.1828 AU
- Semi-major axis: 2.7093 AU
- Eccentricity: 0.1943
- Orbital period (sidereal): 4.46 yr (1,629 d)
- Mean anomaly: 14.339°
- Mean motion: 0° 13^{m} 15.6^{s} / day
- Inclination: 13.850°
- Longitude of ascending node: 123.94°
- Argument of perihelion: 298.11°

Physical characteristics
- Mean diameter: 42.18±0.50 km; 44.65±1.4 km; 44.749±0.370 km
- Synodic rotation period: 5.9314±0.0002 h
- Geometric albedo: 0.139±0.011; 0.1392±0.009; 0.158±0.005
- Spectral type: Tholen = S; B–V = 0.879±0.015; U–B = 0.498±0.035
- Absolute magnitude (H): 9.4

888 Parysatis (prov. designation: A918 CE or 1918 DC) is a stony background asteroid, approximately 44 kilometers (27 miles) in diameter, that is located in the central region of the asteroid belt. It was discovered by German astronomer Max Wolf at the Heidelberg Observatory on 2 February 1918. The S-type asteroid has a rotation period of 5.9 hours. It was named after the Persian Queen Parysatis from the Achaemenid Empire of the 5th century BC.

== Orbit and classification ==
Located in or near the region of the Eunomia family, Parysatis is a non-family asteroid of the main belt's background population when applying the hierarchical clustering method to its proper orbital elements. It orbits the Sun in the central asteroid belt at a distance of 2.2–3.2 AU once every 4 years and 6 months (1,629 days; semi-major axis of 2.71 AU). Its orbit has an eccentricity of 0.19 and an inclination of 14° with respect to the ecliptic. The body's observation arc begins at Vienna Observatory on 24 May 1906, almost 12 years prior to its official discovery observation at Heidelberg on 2 February 1918.

== Naming ==
This minor planet was named after the Persian Queen Parysatis of the Achaemenid Empire in the 5th century BC. She was the wife of the king Darius II, and the mother of Artaxerxes II of Persia, after whom the asteroid 831 Stateira was named. The naming was also mentioned in The Names of the Minor Planets by Paul Herget in 1955 (H 86).

== Physical characteristics ==
In the Tholen classification, Parysatis is a common stony S-type asteroid.

=== Rotation period ===
In November 2006, a rotational lightcurve of Parysatis was obtained from photometric observations by Serbian astronomer Vladimir Benishek at Belgrade Observatory. Lightcurve analysis gave a well-defined rotation period of 5.9314±0.0002 hours with a brightness variation of 0.22±0.03 magnitude (U=3). The result supersedes other period determinations of (5.49±0.01 h) by Marcos Florczak in 1996, (5.928±0.006 h) by Laurent Bernasconi in 2003, and (5.933±0.001 h) by Michael Fleenor in 2006, and by Andy Monson in 2011 (U=2/3−/3−/2).

In April 2017, another lightcurve with a well-defined period of 5.931±0.003 hours and an amplitude of 0.23±0.03 magnitude was obtained by the Spanish group of asteroid observers, OBAS (U=3).

=== Diameter and albedo ===
According to the survey carried out by the Japanese Akari satellite, the Infrared Astronomical Satellite IRAS, and the NEOWISE mission of NASA's Wide-field Infrared Survey Explorer (WISE), Parysatis measures (42.18±0.50), (44.65±1.4) and (44.749±0.370) kilometers in diameter and its surface has an albedo of (0.158±0.005), (0.1392±0.009) and (0.139±0.011), respectively. The Collaborative Asteroid Lightcurve Link adopts the results obtained by IRAS, that is, an albedo of 0.1392 and a diameter of 44.65 kilometers with an absolute magnitude of 9.51. Alternative mean-diameter measurements published by the WISE team include (36.24±10.36 km), (41.65±0.49 km) and (46.189±0.607 km) with corresponding albedos of (0.21±0.13), (0.160±0.020) and (0.1300±0.0424).
