= Stateira =

Stateira or Statira may refer to:

== People ==
- Stateira (wife of Artaxerxes II)
- Stateira (wife of Darius III)
- Stateira (wife of Alexander the Great)

== Operas ==
- La Statira (1726), opera by Tomaso Albinoni
- Statira principessa di Persia (1655), opera by Francesco Cavalli

== Other ==
- 831 Stateira, an asteroid
- Statira (beetle), a genus of darkling beetle in subfamily Lagriinae
- Statira, a synonym of the moth genus Dasyuris
