= Arbupales =

4th-century BC Persian military general

Arbupales (Greek: Ἀρβουπάλης) was one of the Persian generals in the Battle of the Granicus in 334 BC in Asia Minor (modern-day Turkey). He was a son of that Darius who was son of Artaxerxes II and Stateira. He was killed during the battle.
