= Oxathres =

Oxathres (Persian: هُخشَتره) is a Persian name, which is also written Oxoathres and Oxyathres. It is frequently confounded or interchanged both by Greek and Latin writers with Oxartes and Oxyartes. Indeed, it is probable that these are all merely different forms of the same name.

Oxathres is the Greek form of the Ghata Avestan name Huxšathra which is a distinctly Zoroastrian name.

Oxathres may refer to:

- Oxyathres of Persia, a brother of King Darius III Codomannus
- Oxyathres of Heraclea, a son of Dionysius, tyrant of Heraclea
- Oxyartes, father of Roxana
- Oxathres son of Abulites satrap of Susiana under Darius III. Abulites and Oxathres were executed by Alexander of Macedon.
- Oxathres, son of Darius II and Parysatis, whose elder brothers were Artaxerxes, Cyrus, and Ostanes respectively.
