= Ariaspes =

Persian prince, son of Artaxerxes II

Ariaspes (Ancient Greek: Ἀριάσπης; died between 360 and 358 BC) was one of the three legitimate sons of Artaxerxes II of Persia. He was, after the death of his eldest brother Darius, driven to commit suicide by the intrigues of his other brother, Ochus. He was called "Ariarates" by the Roman historian Justin.
