= Atossa (daughter of Artaxerxes II) =

Persian queen

Atossa (in Old Persian: *Utauθa; in Avestan: Hutaosā) was an Achaemenid princess and queen, daughter and wife of the Persian king Artaxerxes II.

She was born to king Artaxerxes II and queen Stateira.

Atossa had been promised as a wife to the noble Tiribazus by her father. However, it was the king himself who fell in love with his own daughter and even married her against all Persian laws and customs. Artaxerxes II made Persian judges ensure him that, as the great king, he was above all laws and had permission to marry whoever he wanted, including his own daughter. It is said that his love for her was so great that he slept with her even when she had leprosy. This incestuous relationship, unprecedented until then, was significantly supported by the queen mother Parysatis, who hoped to have increasing influence over her son. Later, Artaxerxes II also married his second daughter, Amastris.

Among her brothers, Atossa supported the youngest, Ochus (later Artaxerxes III), in the succession line, with whom she allegedly had a secret affair, against the eldest, Darius. To achieve this, she used her relationship with her father to ensure Ochus ascended to the throne in her favor. Ochus assumed the throne, but after his death in 338 BC, Atossa, like many other members of the family, was assassinated.

== Literature ==
- Carsten Binder: Plutarchs Vita des Artaxerxes: Ein historischer Kommentar. Walter de Gruyter, 2008, S. 309–311.
