= Aspasia of Phocaea =

Ancient wife of Cyrus the Younger

Aspasia (Ancient Greek: Ἀσπασία) of Phocaea, daughter of Hermotimus, was carried away from her country to be in the harem of the Achaemenid prince Cyrus the Younger, who so admired her beauty and her superior qualities of mind and character that he made her his favorite wife, nicknaming her "the wise one" (sophe). She may or may not have been a hetaira.

Her name is said to have originally been "Milto," until Cyrus called her "Aspasia" after the renowned and wise mistress of Pericles; but "Milto" itself seems to have been a name expressive of the beauty of her complexion.

She is said to have frequently aided him with her advice, the adoption of which he never regretted; and they lived together with great mutual affection until the death of Cyrus at the Battle of Cunaxa. She then fell into the hands of his rival and brother Artaxerxes II, and became his wife.

Contemporary accounts by the writer Xenophon, who claimed to personally witness the scene, indicated that Aspasia was so renowned that Artaxerxes wanted her treated as valued and not as a slave. When his officers brought Aspasia to him in chains, he threw the officers in prison and bestowed valuable gifts on Aspasia. She was given an honored place among Artaxerxes's several wives and hundreds of concubines. There is even an anecdote in which, after the death of Tiridates, Artaxerxes's favorite eunuch, whom Artaxerxes grieved intensely, Aspasia soothed the king by consoling him while cross-dressing in Tiridates's clothing.

When Darius, eldest son of Artaxerxes, was appointed successor to the throne, he asked his father to surrender Aspasia to him. The request, it seems, could not be refused, as coming from the king elect. Artaxerxes, therefore, gave her up, on finding that she herself consented to the transfer; but he soon took her away again, and made her priestess of Anahita at a temple at Ecbatana, where strict celibacy was required. This, the historian Plutarch asserts, was done in order to prevent his son from coupling with his favored wife. This slight gave rise to a conspiracy of Darius against his father, whom he plotted to murder, a conspiracy which cost Darius his life once it was discovered.

== Cinderella ==
Her story may have been an inspiration, in part, for the European fairy tale of Cinderella. This primarily comes from the account of Claudius Aelianus in his Varia Historia. In this telling, Aspasia's mother dies in childbirth and her father raises her in poverty. She dreams of being wedded to a man of noble station, but despairs on account of her social station as well as because of an unsightly growth on her face. Aphrodite, playing a sort of fairy godmother role in the tale, reveals a treatment for the growth in a dream. She attends a banquet of Cyrus's, and rebuffs the prince's attentions, causing him to feel even more attracted. Ultimately he overcomes her reluctance, and the two wed.

Aspasia was referred to in medieval English culture as a byword for a woman with superior qualities, as in the Elizabethan play Friar Bacon and Friar Bungay, by Robert Greene.

Margaret, as milde and humble in her thoughts,

As was Aspatia unto Cirus selfe.

Yeelds thanks
