= Abulites =

4th-century BC Achaemenid satrap of Susiana

Abulites retained the satrapy of Susania under Alexander the Great in 330 BC.

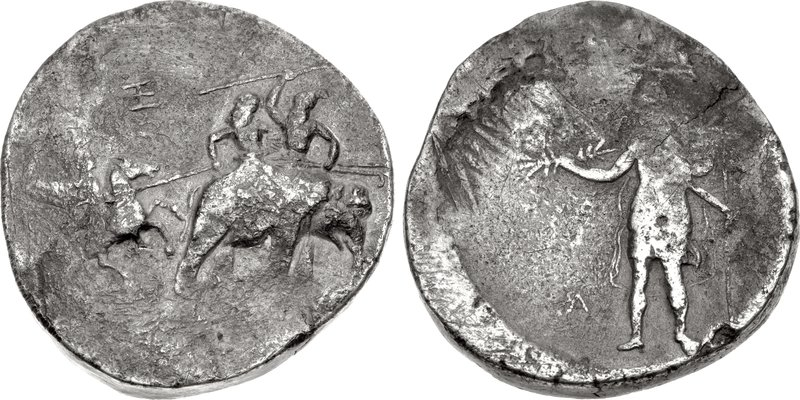
The "Porus" coinage of Alexander, struck circa 325-323 BC in Susa or Babylon, often bears the marks "AB" and "Ξ" (here "Ξ" appears on the obverse and "AB" on the reverse -the hoops of the "B" appear on the left leg of the "A"), which may correspond to Abulites and Xenophilus.

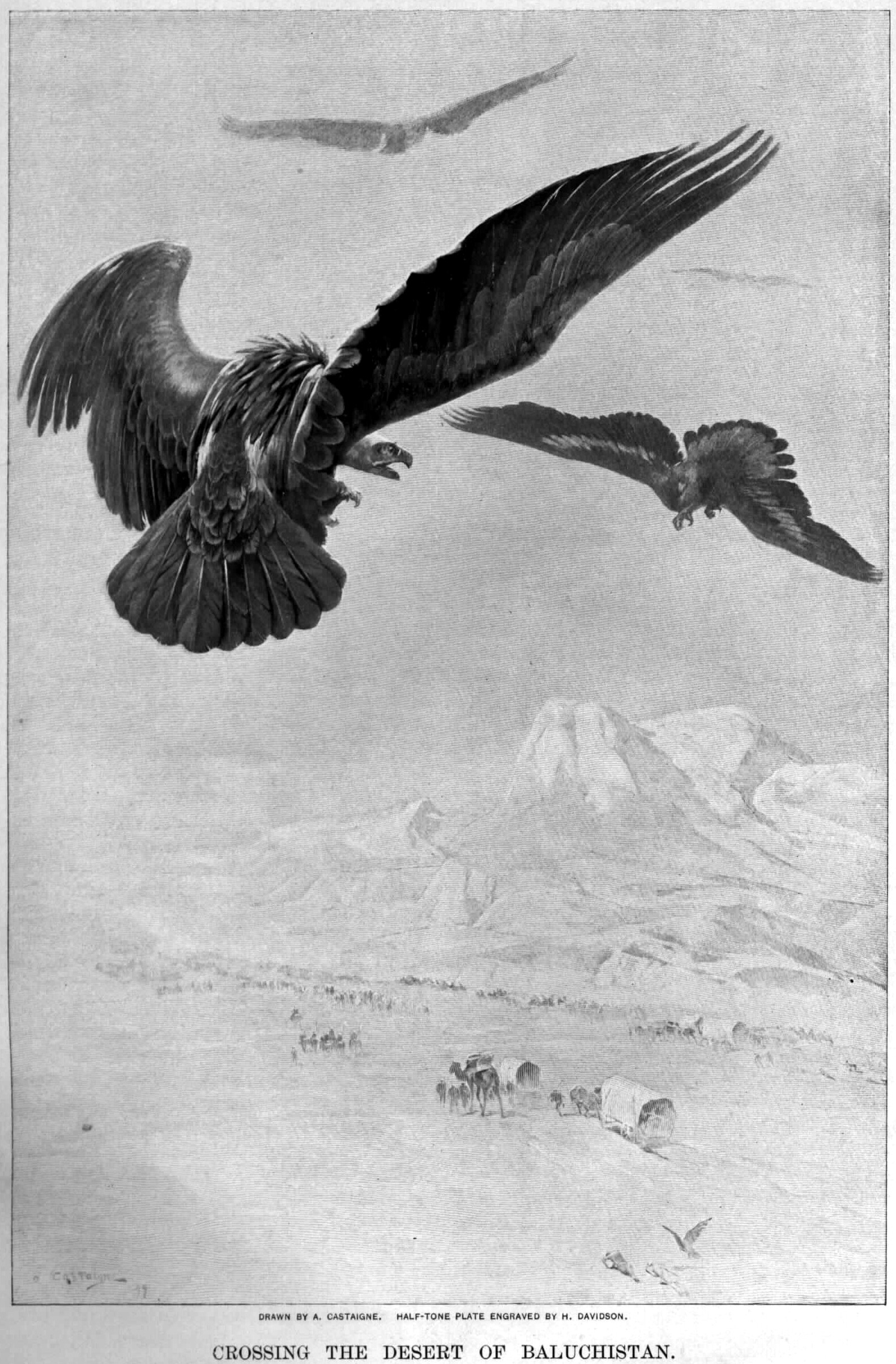
Abulites went to help Alexander in the crossing of the Gedrosian desert, but he brought a huge load of coins rather than much-needed supplies, thus precipitating his demise.

Abulites (Attic Greek: Ἀβουλίτης) was the Achaemenid satrap (governor) of Susiana during the reign of Darius III (336–330 BC), and retained the satrapy as a Hellenistic satrap under Alexander the Great until circa 324 BC, when he was executed for sedition.

== Surrender to Alexander ==
He may have been of Elamite origin, although his son, Oxathres (Gatha Avestan: Huxšathra), bears an Iranian name, "one that seems distinctly Zoroastrian". After the Battle of Gaugamela (331 BC), the Mesopotamian province of the Achaemenid Empire quickly fell to Alexander. Thereafter, Abulites had no choice but to surrender nearby Susa. After entering Susa, Alexander captured "a vast collection of treasure, including 50,000 talents of silver in ingots". Treasure from Xerxes' campaign in mainland Greece was found and taken as well. Some statuary from Athens, such as the bronze statue of Harmodius and Haristogiton, "the Tyrant-slayers", was recovered by Alexander in Susa. Susa was the co-capital of the Achaemenid Persian Empire, but the "hoarding of specie" does illustrate the "shortsightedness of Achaemenid fiscal policy" according to C. J. Brunner.

As Alexander was preparing to move into Persis, he left a garrison under the Macedonian Xenophilus (who replaced the Persian commandant Mazarus), and reconfirmed Abulites as satrap of Susania, "holding civil jurisdiction". Abulites remained satrap until Alexander's return from his Indian campaign; in the meantime, Abulites may "have moved to assert his independence". Though this remains unclear, Abulites and his son were "promptly arrested and executed". "Immediately afterwards", Alexander organized the mass weddings at Susa, "thus again showing his commitment to the ideal of Greek and Persian partnership".

== Gedrosian desert and coinage ==
Plutarch (Alex. 68.7) relates a story in which Abulites was requested by Alexander to bring supplies after the disastrous crossing of the Gedrosian desert, but Abulites instead brought huge amounts of coinage, about 3000 tales (86 tons). In a rage, Alexander threw the coins at horses, asking what help this would be to a hungry army. Alexander shouted "What good have you done having brought this?". Thereafter Abulites was jailed by Alexander. Some of these coins may have been the "Porus" coins of Alexander, struck in 325-323 BC in Babylon or Susa, which often bear the initials "AB" and "Ξ", possibly identified with the initials of Abulites and his associated Macedonian general Xenophilus.

== Sources ==
- Brunner, C.J. (1983). "ABOULITES". Encyclopaedia Iranica, Vol. I, Fasc. 3. p. 228.
- Heckel, Waldemar (2009). "Alexander's Conquest of Asia". In Heckel, Waldemar; Tritle, Lawrence A. (eds.). Alexander the Great: A New History. Blackwell Publishing. ISBN 978-1444360158.
