= Scaphism =

Alleged Ancient Persian method of execution

Scaphism (from Greek σκάφη, meaning "boat"), also known as the boats, is reported by Plutarch in his Life of Artaxerxes, citing Ctesias, as an ancient Persian method of execution. He describes the victim being trapped between two small boats, one inverted on top of the other, with limbs and head sticking out, feeding them and smearing them with milk and honey, and allowing them to fester and be devoured by insects and other vermin over time.

Like other related acts described by Ctesias, the use of this method is historically doubted.

== Historical descriptions ==
1591 woodcut depicting two men subjected to scaphism

The first mention of scaphism is Plutarch's description of the execution of the soldier Mithridates, given as punishment by king Artaxerxes II for taking the king’s valor and claiming to be the one who killed his brother Cyrus the Younger, who had rebelled in an attempt to claim the throne of the Achaemenid Empire:

[The king] decreed that Mithridates should be put to death in boats; which execution is after the following manner: Taking two boats framed exactly to fit and answer each other, they lie down in one of them the malefactor that suffers, upon his back; then, covering it with the other, and so setting them together that the head, hands, and feet of him are left outside, and the rest of his body lies shut up within, then forcing him to ingest a mixture of milk and honey before pouring all over his face and body. They then keep his face continually turned towards the sun; and it becomes completely covered up and hidden by the multitude of flies that settle on it. And as within the boats he does what those that eat and drink must needs do, creeping things and vermin spring out of the corruption and rottenness of the excrement, and these entering into the bowels of him, his body is consumed. When the man is manifestly dead, the uppermost boat being taken off, they find his flesh devoured, and swarms of such noisome creatures preying upon and, as it were, growing to his inwards. In this way Mithridates, after suffering for seventeen days, at last expired.

— Plutarch, Life of Artaxerxes

The 12th-century Byzantine chronicler Joannes Zonaras later described the punishment, based on Plutarch:

The Persians outvie all other barbarians in the horrid cruelty of their punishments, employing tortures that are peculiarly terrible and long-drawn, namely the 'boats' and sewing men up in raw hides. But what is meant by the 'boats,' I must now explain for the benefit of the readers. Two boats are joined together one on top of the other, with holes cut in them in such a way that the victim's head, hands, and feet only are left outside. Within these boats the man to be punished is placed lying on his back, and the boats then nailed together with bolts. Next they pour a mixture of milk and honey into the wretched man's mouth, till he is filled to the point of nausea, smearing his face, feet, and arms with the same mixture, and so leave him exposed to the sun. This is repeated every day, the effect being that flies, wasps, and bees, attracted by the sweetness, settle on his face and all such parts of him as project outside the boats, and miserably torment and sting the wretched man. Moreover his belly, distended as it is with milk and honey, throws off liquid excrements, and these putrefying breed swarms of worms, intestinal and of all sorts. Thus the victim lying in the boats, his flesh rotting away in his own filth and devoured by worms, dies a lingering and horrible death.

— Zonaras, Annals

It is believed that Plutarch's account of Scaphism came from Ctesias, a Greek physician and historian. However, Ctesias's credibility is questionable due to his reputation for fanciful and exaggerated narratives. His uncorroborated accounts have stirred debates about the veracity of his work.

== In fiction ==
- In Shakespeare's The Winter's Tale, the rogue Autolycus falsely tells the shepherd and his son that because Perdita has fallen in love with the prince, her adoptive father will be stoned, while her adoptive brother will be subjected to the following punishment:
  He has a son,—who shall be flayed alive; then 'nointed over with honey, set on the head of a wasp's nest; then stand till he be three quarters and a dram dead; then recovered again with aqua-vitae or some other hot infusion; then, raw as he is, and in the hottest day prognostication proclaims, shall he be set against a brick wall, the sun looking with a southward eye upon him,—where he is to behold him with flies blown to death.
- In H. Rider Haggard's The Ancient Allan the protagonist Allan Quatermain experiences a vision of one of his past lives, in which he was a great Egyptian hunter named Shabaka. At one time he is condemned to "death by the boat" by the "King of kings" because of a hunting bet they had made. When Shabaka asks what is to happen to him, he is told by a eunuch:
  This, O Egyptian slayer of lions. You will be laid upon a bed in a little boat upon the river and another boat will be placed over you, for these boats are called the Twins, Egyptian, in such a fashion that your head and your hands will project at one end and your feet at the other. There you will be left, comfortable as a baby in its cradle, and twice every day the best of food and drink will be brought to you. Should your appetite fail, moreover, it will be my duty to revive it by pricking your eyes with the point of a knife until it returns. Also after each meal I shall wash your face, your hands and your feet with milk and honey, lest the flies that buzz about them should suffer hunger, and to preserve your skin from burning by the sun. Thus slowly you will grow weaker and at length fall asleep. The last one who went into the boat—he, unlucky man, had by accident wandered into the court of the House of Women and seen some of the ladies there unveiled—only lived for twelve days, but you, being so strong, may hope to last for eighteen.
- In The Venture Bros. episode "The Bellicose Proxy", a variation of this torture is described with tubs in place of boats.
- In Instinct, Season 2 Episode 5 "Ancient History", a victim of this torture is shown.
- In Your Pretty Face Is Going to Hell's Season 4 episode "Milk and Honey", this torture (and a demon in the business of selling the boats used for it) is prominent.
- Blindboy Boatclub's short story "Scaphism" describes a murder committed using this method.
- In Inside No. 9's Season 8 episode "The Last Weekend", this torture is used as a method of revenge.

== See also ==
- Cyphonism
