= Cyphonism =

Method of torture

Cyphonism (Ancient Greek: κυφωνισμός, romanized: kyphōnismos, from κῡφός, "bent, crooked") was a form of punishment using a κύφων (kyphōn), a kind of wooden pillory in which the neck of a malefactor would be fastened. Some sources describe cyphonism more specifically as involving a method similar to scaphism, in which a person's naked body, having been locked in the kyphōn, was smeared with honey, and exposed to flies, wasps, and other pests.

== Greek sources ==
The Greek term kyphōnismos survives in two places. The first is an explanatory gloss in the scholia on the Plutus of Aristophanes. The scholiast writes merely that the kyphōn is a "fetter made of wood", and kyphōnismos is the name given to a punishment using it; bad men, therefore, are likewise called kyphōnes.

The Suda, a medieval Byzantine lexicon, offers a further definition under the headword κυφανισμός (kyphanismos), stating that it refers to a "bad and ruinous" (κακός καὶ ὀλέθριος) form of punishment. Elsewhere, describing kyphōnes, the Suda appends a fragment of Claudius Aelianus recounting a law said to have been in force in the Cretan city of Lyctus: "If someone be so bold and pay no heed to what is in the law, let him be bound to the pillory (kyphōn) next to the town hall for 20 days, doused in honey, naked, and in milk, so that he may be dinner for bees and flies. And when the time has passed, that he be pushed off a cliff, wrapping him in a woman's robe."

== Later use of the term ==
The term's use in the West dates back to the Renaissance humanist Caelius Rhodiginus, who discussed "cyphonismus" in his 1516 Antiquarum Lectionum ("Of Ancient Readings") alongside a Latin translation of the Lyctian law from the Suda. Subsequent authors identified the description with a form of torture involving exposure to insects which the late antique Christian historian Jerome recounted being meted out to past martyrs in his vita of Paul of Thebes. This connection would partly obscure the original context of the term: in 1782 the Deutsche Encyclopädie defined cyphonism as a form of torture suffered by 3rd-century martyrs, and in 1797 the third edition of the Encyclopaedia Britannica pronounced that "the learned are at a loss to determine what [cyphonism] was", noting only its possible relevance to Jerome's account of Paul.
