= Razia Begum Safavi =

Safavid royal consort (1700–1776)

- Mahd-e Olyā

Queen Consort of Persia
- Tenure: 8 March 1736 – 20 June 1747
- Born: c. 1700; Isfahan, Safavid Iran
- Died: 1776 (aged 75–76); Karbala, Ottoman Empire (modern-day Iraq)
- Burial: Imam Hossein shrine
- Spouse: Nader Shah (m. 1729; died 1747)
- Dynasty: Safavid (by birth); Afsharid (by marriage)
- Father: Soltan Hoseyn

Razia Begum Safavi (Persian: راضیه بیگم صفوی; 1700–1776) was a Safavid princess and the royal consort of Nader Shah of Iran (r. 1736–1747).

She was the daughter of Soltan Hoseyn and the sister of Tahmasp II. Nader Shah married her in 1729 and they had one daughter. In 1736, her spouse became the Shah and founded the Afsharid dynasty. As a member of the preceding Safavid dynasty, she had great symbolic importance and wielded great influence in harem affairs.
