= Xenophilus (phrourarch) =

4th-century BC Macedonian military officer

Xenophilus was military governor of the satrapy of Susania under Alexander the Great from 330 BC.

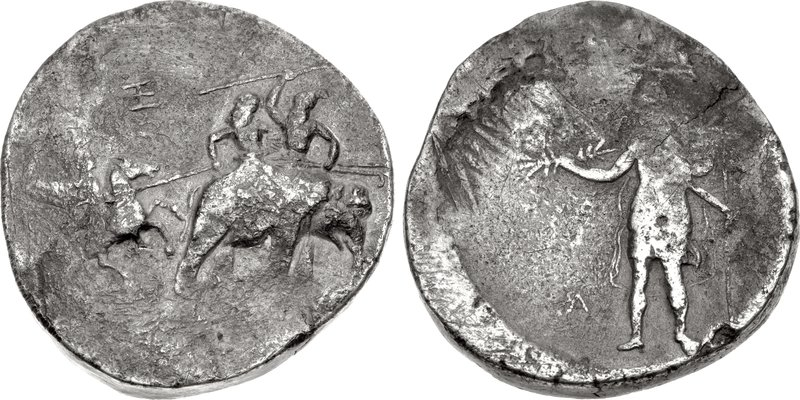
The "Porus" coinage of Alexander, struck circa 325-323 BC in Susa or Babylon, often bears the marks "AB" and "Ξ" (here "Ξ" appears on the obverse and "AB" on the reverse -the hoops of the "B" appear on the left leg of the "A"), which may correspond to Abulites and Xenophilus.

Xenophilus (fl. second half of the 4th century BC) was a Macedonian military figure under Alexander the Great.

As Alexander was preparing to move into Persis, he left a garrison in Susa, appointed Xenophilus as its garrison commander (phrourarch), and reconfirmed Abulites as satrap of Susiana, "holding civil jurisdiction". Xenophilus replaced the Persian commandant of Susa, Mazarus. During the Wars of the Diadochi he defended Susa against the forces of Seleucus I. What became of Xenophilus is unknown, but it is likely that Antigonus either kept him in honorable detention (as appears to be the case with Peucestas) or eliminated him.

== Sources ==
- Who's Who in the Age of Alexander the Great - Waldemar Heckel ISBN 978-1-4051-1210-9
- Brunner, C.J. (1983). "ABOULITES". Encyclopaedia Iranica, Vol. I, Fasc. 3. p. 228.
- Heckel, Waldemar (2009). "Alexander's Conquest of Asia". In Heckel, Waldemar; Tritle, Lawrence A. (eds.). Alexander the Great: A New History. Blackwell Publishing. ISBN 978-1444360158.
