= Eranyak =

Armenian princess

Eranyak was a princess from the Arsacid dynasty of Armenia who lived in the 4th century.

Eranyak was the daughter of the Roman Client King of Armenia, Tiran (Tigranes VII) who reigned from 339 until 350 by an unnamed wife and was the sister of her father's successor, Arsaces II (Arshak II). Little is known on the life of Eranyak.

At some point Tiran arranged for his daughter to marry an Armenian prince from the Bagratuni dynasty called Tiridates who is also known as Trdat. Tiridates was the son of Sembatuhi, as his maternal grandfather was the Great Sembat. Tiridates in character was brave and bold, but was short and of a pitiable appearance.

When Eranyak and Tiridates married each other, Eranyak through marriage she was a relation of the Bagratuni dynasty and Tiridates through marriage was a relation of the Arsacid dynasty. Despite their royal lineage and aristocrat origins, Eranyak and Tiridates had an unhappy marriage.

Eranyak hated Tiridates. She treated her husband with contempt and complained a woman of her status was forced to co-habit with a man of disagreeable countenance and inglorious descent. For Tiridates it reached a point, that he grew so angry that one day, he violent beat Eranyak, cut off her blond hair, tore out the ringlets and ordered her to be removed from their apartment. After Eranyak was removed from their place of residence, Tiridates left Armenia and headed to Media. When Tiridates had arrived in Sewniq, he heard the news of the death of his father-in-law and remained there upon receiving the news. After that moment, not much more is known on Eranyak and Tiridates.
