= Tiridates (eunuch) =

Ancient Parthian eunuch and favored of Artaxerxes II

Tiridates (Parthian: 𐭕𐭉𐭓𐭉𐭃𐭕, Tīridāt; Ancient Greek: Τιριδάτης, Tiridátes) was a eunuch in the court of the Achaemenid king Artaxerxes II, described as "the most handsome and attractive man in Asia", and the king's lover. He features in Claudius Aelianus's account of Artaxerxes, in his Varia Historia, but is absent in the accounts of a similar time frame of Xenophon and Plutarch. Scholars generally believe some of the later writers were referencing different, earlier accounts of events that are now lost.

The historian Claudius Aelianus wrote in his Varia Historia that Tiridates died young, "barely more than a child", and Artaxerxes was inconsolable at the loss. A favored concubine, Aspasia of Phocaea, soothed the king by consoling him while cross-dressing in Tiridates's clothing. Artaxerxes asked her to visit him in Tiridates's clothing until his grief had been healed.

There was a different, unrelated Tiridates, also a eunuch, who was a royal treasurer at Perseopolis, who was asked to betray that city to Alexander the Great, but refused.
