= Fatemeh Soltan Baghbanbashi =

Iranian royal consort

Fatemeh Soltan Baghbanbashi (Persian: فاطمه سلطان باغبانباشی) was a concubineof Naser al-Din Shah Qajar of Iran (r. 1848–1896).

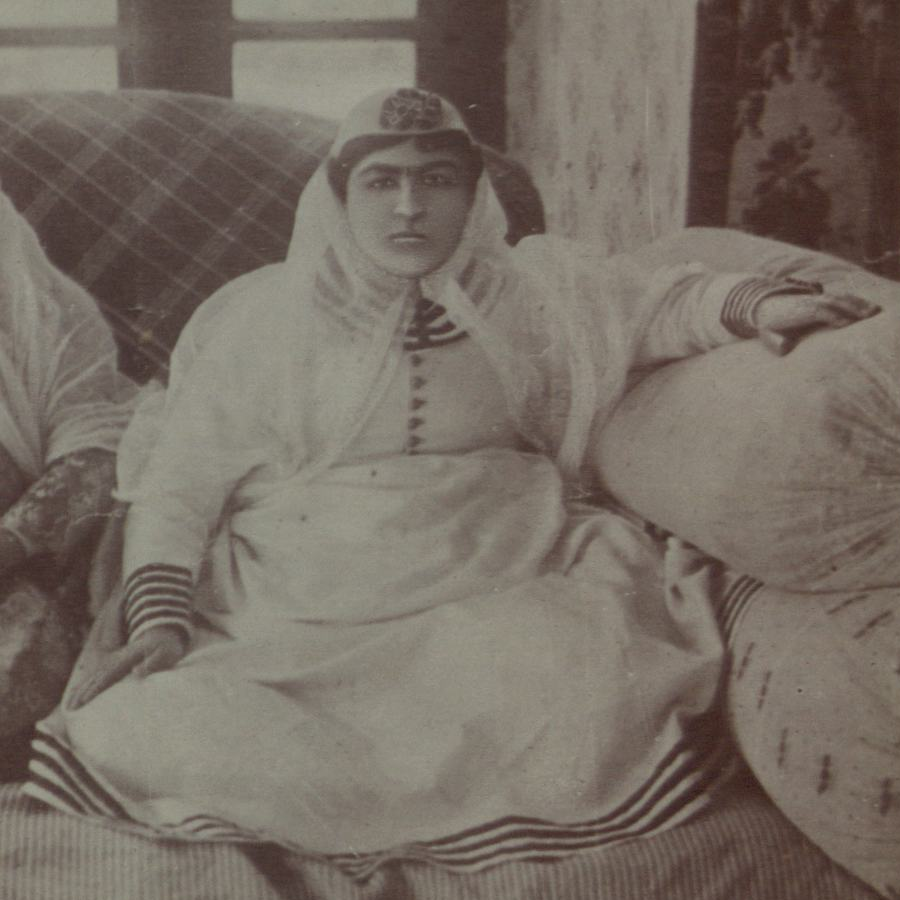
Photograph of Fatemeh Soltan Baghbanbashi

She was one of the most influential favorite concubines of the Shah during the last years of his reign. SInce the Shah married her in a temporary marriage and she was therefore classified as a concubine.
