= Darius (son of Artaxerxes II) =

Son of Artaxerxes II

Darius (c. 412 BC – 362/361 BC) was an Achaemenid prince, the eldest son of Artaxerxes II of Persia by his consort Stateira.

According to Plutarch's Life of Artaxerxes, Darius was recognised at the age of fifty as co-regent and heir-apparent to his father. While in this role, according to custom, Darius could request a boon from the king. He asked to be given the latter's concubine, Aspasia of Phocaea. Artaxerxes initially agreed, though later changed his mind and subsequently made Aspasia a priestess of Anahita at Ecbatana, removing her from Darius' reach.

Angered, Darius plotted to assassinate his father, working alongside the noble Tiribazus, who had previously been denied the king's daughters in marriage. Many of Darius' half-brothers were also involved in the conspiracy. However, a eunuch forewarned Artaxerxes, who had Darius arrested and tried. When the judges condemned him to death, Darius was brought before the king. The prince requested clemency, though Artaxerxes grabbed Darius by the hair and cut his neck himself. Several courtiers, as well as fifty of Darius' half-brothers and their families, were also killed. Among Darius' family, only one infant was spared.

Neither the dating nor chronology of these events are certain. According to Iranologist Rüdiger Schmitt, Darius' death is commonly attributed to 362/361 BC (and his year of birth consequently to c. 412 BC), though Schmitt considers this far from convincing.

According to Arrian, Darius was the father of Arbupales, who, perhaps on account of his youth, escaped the later purge accompanying Artaxerxes III's ascension. Arbupales was among the commanders killed in the Battle of the Granicus in 334 BC.

== Sources ==
- Briant, Pierre (2002), From Cyrus to Alexander: A History of the Persian Empire, Eisenbrauns, ISBN 978-1-57506-120-7
- Heckel, Waldemar (2008), Who's Who in the Age of Alexander the Great: Prosopography of Alexander's Empire, John Wiley & Sons, ISBN 978-1-4051-5469-7
- Llewellyn-Jones, Lloyd (2022), "Violent Delights Have Violent Ends", Persians: The Age of the Great Kings, London: Headline Publishing Group, ISBN 978-1-5416-0035-5
- Schmitt, Rüdiger (2011) [1986]. "ARTAXERXES II". iranicaonline.org. Encyclopædia Iranica. Archived from the original on 29 January 2017.
- Schmitt, Rüdiger (2016) [1994]. "DARIUS vi. Achaemenid Princes". iranicaonline.org. Encyclopædia Iranica.
- Waters, Matt (2014), Ancient Persia: A Concise History of the Achaemenid Empire, 550–330 BCE, New York: Cambridge University Press, p. 193, ISBN 978-1-107-65272-9
