= Parysatis =

Persian Queen, wife of Darius II, mother of Artaxerxes II

Parysatis (/pəˈrɪsətɪs/; Old Persian: Parušyātiš, Ancient Greek: Παρύσατις; 5th-century BC) was a Persian queen, consort of Darius II, who had a large influence during the reign of her son Artaxerxes II.

== Biography ==
Parysatis was a Persian noblewoman of the Achaemenid dynasty. She was the daughter of Artanes, the brother of King Xerxes I. She married Darius II, with whom she had several children, including Artaxerxes II and Cyrus the Younger. Ancient sources sometimes mistakenly describe her as a daughter of Artaxerxes I, but modern scholarship identifies her as the daughter of Artanes, not a royal princess of Artaxerxes I.

She and Darius II had many children, possibly 13 in total, but only a few are known by name. Their sons included Artaxerxes II, Cyrus the Younger, Ostanes, and Oxathres. They also had at least two daughters, Amestris and Stateira.

=== Influence at the Persian Court ===
Parysatis was a politically very powerful woman and possessed an extensive network of spies and informants throughout the empire, particularly within the court. In addition, she relied on a network of supporters and political clients who played a crucial role in advancing her political aims and projects. Ctesias, who was her physician, notes in his works and books that she used her intelligence network to identify individuals who posed potential threats to the throne and then, with the assistance of her loyal followers and supporters, ordered their removal and execution. Parysatis was very savvy and succeeded in assisting Darius II's ascent to the throne, even though he was a bastard and not a legitimate child. Ctesias records that Darius was very dependent on her counsel. With the help of her nationwide networks and the king's support, she effectively ruled.

In addition, she is mentioned to have held a lot of land and villages in Syria, Media and Babylon. There also remains a record of the taxes paid directly to her and to Ea-bullissu, the servant who was in charge of managing her holdings and tax collections.

=== Supporting Cyrus the Younger ===
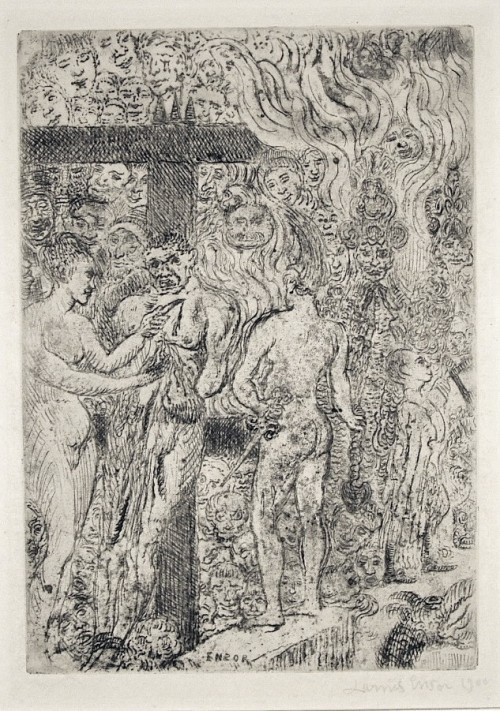
Queen Parysatis flaying a eunuch by James Ensor

Her favorite son was Cyrus, and it was on account of her influence that he was given supreme command in western Anatolia as a teenager in around 407 BC. When her husband died, she supported Cyrus. When Cyrus was defeated in the Battle of Cunaxa, she blamed the satrap Tissaphernes for his death, and thus had him assassinated not long after.

According to the chapter on Artaxerxes II in Plutarch's Life, a young Persian soldier named Mithridates unknowingly struck Cyrus the Younger during the Battle of Cunaxa, making him fall from his horse, dazed. Some eunuchs found Cyrus and tried to bring him to safety, but a Caunian among the king's camp followers struck a vein behind his knee with a dart, making him fall and strike his head on a stone, whereupon he died. Unwisely, Mithridates boasted of killing Cyrus in the court, and Parysatis had him executed by scaphism. She likewise got vengeance on Masabates, the king's eunuch, who had cut off Cyrus's hand and head, by winning him from her son Artaxerxes in a game of dice and having him flayed alive. It is difficult to determine if Parysatis's action against the Caunian was an ordeal practice or a distortedly reported mirror punishment. The sadistic acts reported by Ctesias are historically doubtful.

=== Rivalry with Stateira ===
Stateira was the wife of Artaxerxes II. Her brother, Terituchmes, loved one of his half-sisters more than his intended bride: Amestris, Darius II and Parysatis's daughter. Terituchmes tried to start a rebellion, and Parysatis had all the family killed and only spared the life of Stateira at the request of her husband.

After Artaxerxes II took control and Cyrus's attempt to seize the throne failed, the queen mother Parysatis and queen consort Stateira both tried to be the key political influence on the king, making them bitter rivals.

Reportedly the intense hatred between the two women led Parysatis to encourage Artaxerxes II to take on concubines in order to hurt his wife. Stateira also publicly spoke up against the cruelties of the queen mother at the Persian court. For example, she criticized the brutal treatment of the eunuch Masabates, intensifying her conflict with Parysatis.

Finally, Parysatis had Stateira murdered. Classical sources give different reasons for this deed. According to one version, Parysatis wanted to save the life of the Spartan commander Clearchus and his fellow-generals, who had been taken prisoner by Tissaphernes, but Stateira had succeeded in persuading her husband to execute the prisoners. Therefore, Parysatis is supposed to have poisoned Stateira. Plutarch, in his biography of Artaxerxes II, did not believe this story. According to another tradition, Parysatis murdered her daughter-in-law because she realized that her son only felt true love for his wife. Plutarch reports that Parysatis performed the assassination with the help of a loyal servant named Gigis. She carved a bird with a poisoned knife in such a way that only one half of the animal was mixed with the poison. This half was served to Stateira when they were dining together. The poisoned meal caused the painful death of Stateira.

Artaxerxes was enraged and tried to capture Gigis, who was being hidden in Parysatis's quarters. Eventually, she was captured when she visited her family and was executed. Parysatis was banished to Babylon, but returned afterwards to continue to provide advice and counsel to the king. She advised him to marry his daughters Amestris and Atossa, to continue her influence over him, as they were less experienced in court.

Parysatis disappeared from records shortly after this, and the year of her death is unknown. Having dominated the Achaemenid court for more than 60 years, historian Lloyd Llewellyn-Jones estimates she would have been aged around 90 by the time of her death.

== In popular culture ==
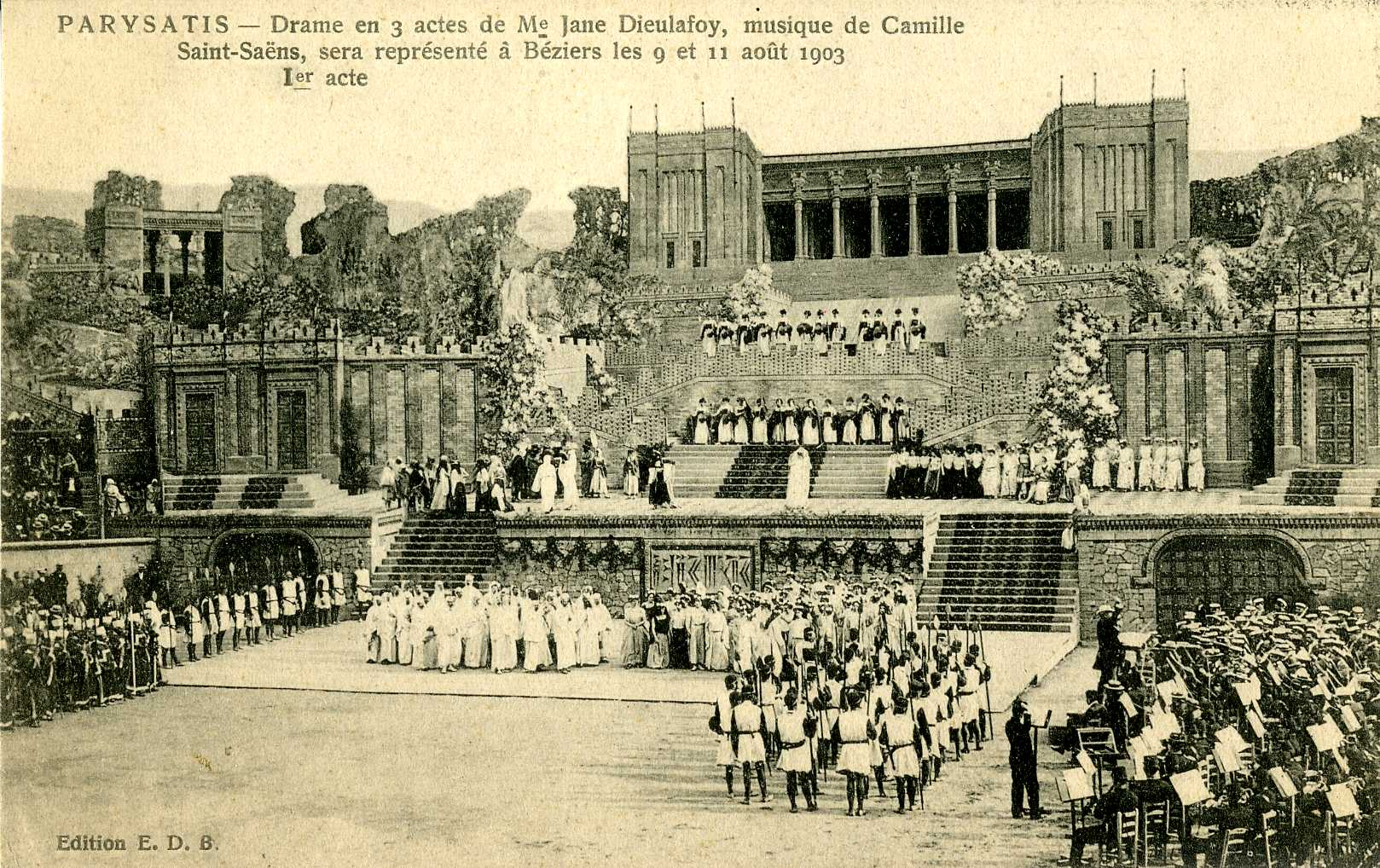
Parysatis opera, written by Jane Dieulafoy, with music by Camille Saint-Saëns in 1902

- Asteroid 888 Parysatis, discovered by Max Wolf is named after her.
- Jane Dieulafoy wrote a novel called Parysatis in 1890. It was later turned into a play with instrumental music by Camille Saint-Saëns in 1902.
- James Ensor created an etching called La Reine Parysatis ecorchant un eunuque (Queen Parysatis flaying a eunuch), showing the execution of Masabates
- In the pilot episode of Sister Boniface Mysteries the murder is committed by poisoning half of a peach with cyanide, which is served to the victim while the murderer eats the other half and is unharmed. The story of Parysatis is noted as the inspiration for the crime.

== See also ==
- List of Iranian women royalty
