= 831 Stateira =

Main-belt asteroid

Discovery
- Discovered by: Max Wolf
- Discovery site: Heidelberg
- Discovery date: 20 September 1916

Designations
- Pronunciation: /stæˈtaɪərə/
- Alternative designations: 1916 AA; 1926 VA; 1949 SQ; 1949 UO1; 1971 KZ; 1972 RV1

Orbital characteristics
- Epoch 31 July 2016 (JD 2457600.5)
- Uncertainty parameter 0
- Observation arc: 89.43 yr (32664 d)
- Aphelion: 2.5345 AU (379.16 Gm)
- Perihelion: 1.8906 AU (282.83 Gm)
- Semi-major axis: 2.2125 AU (330.99 Gm)
- Eccentricity: 0.14550
- Orbital period (sidereal): 3.29 yr (1202.1 d)
- Mean anomaly: 91.2840°
- Mean motion: 0° 17^{m} 58.128^{s} / day
- Inclination: 4.8364°
- Longitude of ascending node: 178.081°
- Argument of perihelion: 224.935°
- Earth MOID: 0.900859 AU (134.7666 Gm)
- Jupiter MOID: 2.85692 AU (427.389 Gm)
- T_{Jupiter}: 3.637

Physical characteristics
- Synodic rotation period: 4 h (0.17 d)
- Absolute magnitude (H): 13.1

831 Stateira is an asteroid belonging to the Baptistina family in the Main Belt named after Stateira, wife of Artaxerexes II.
