= Amestris (daughter of Artaxerxes II) =

Amestris (Greek: Άμηστρις, Amēstris, perhaps the same as Άμαστρις, Amāstris, from Old Persian Amāstrī-, "strong woman"); 4th-century BC) was an Achaemenid queen, consort of the Persian king Artaxerxes II.

She was the daughter of Artaxerxes II. Her father bethrothed her to Tiribazus. However, he broke the engagement and married his daughter himself.
