= Stateira (wife of Artaxerxes II) =

Achaemenid queen

Stateira (Greek: Στάτειρα; died about 400 BC) was an Achaemenid queen, consort of the Persian king Artaxerxes II and mother of his successor, Artaxerxes III.

== Biography ==
Stateira was the daughter of the Persian nobleman Hydarnes. She married Artaxerxes II, the oldest son of Darius II of Persia, and his wife Parysatis. Darius II probably wanted to establish good relations with an important noble family, from which Stateira was descended because her brother Terituchmes married Amestris, a daughter of Darius II. Terituchmes loved one of his half-sisters more than his royal bride and tried to start a rebellion. Therefore, according to legend, Parysatis had all the children of Hydarnes killed and only spared the life of Stateira at the request of her husband.

Artaxerxes II took over the Persian throne in 404 BC after the death of his father. Stateira seems to have been his only legal wife despite his numerous concubines. She bore a son, Artaxerxes, the heir to the throne, and probably other children. The queen's mother Parysatis and Stateira tried to be the key political influence on the king; so the women became bitter rivals.

Stateira was very popular with the people, allegedly because she left the curtains open when she drove in her carriage and because she talked to the ordinary people. She supported her husband in his quarrel with his brother Cyrus the Younger and criticized her sharp-tongued mother-in-law, because Parysatis had helped her favorite son Cyrus in his attempt to win the Persian throne from his brother Artaxerxes II. Reportedly the intense hatred between the two women led Parysatis to encourage Artaxerxes II to take on concubines to hurt his wife. Stateira also publicly spoke up against the cruelties of the queen mother at the Persian court. For example, she criticized the brutal treatment of the eunuch Masabates and therefore intensified her conflict with Parysatis.

Finally Parysatis had Stateira murdered. Classical sources give different reasons for this deed. According to one version, Parysatis wanted to save the life of the Spartan commander Clearchus and his fellow generals, who had been taken prisoner by Tissaphernes, but Stateira had succeeded in persuading her husband to execute the prisoners. Therefore, Parysatis is supposed to have poisoned Stateira. Plutarch, in his biography of Artaxerxes II, did not believe this story. According to another tradition, Parysatis murdered her daughter-in-law because she realized that her son only felt true love for his wife. Plutarch reports that Parysatis performed the assassination with the help of a loyal servant named Gigis. She carved a bird with a poisoned knife in such a way that only one-half of the animal was mixed with the poison. This half was served to Stateira when they were dining together. The poisoned meal caused the painful death of Stateira.

== Posteriority ==
- Stateira plays a key role in the novel Callirhoe by the Greek author Chariton, who probably lived in the 1st or 2nd century AD.
- The Asteroid 831 Stateira, discovered in 1916, is named in her honour.
