= Artaxerxes II =

King of the Achaemenid Empire from 405/4 to 359/8 BC

Artaxerxes II 𐎠𐎼𐎫𐎧𐏁𐏂
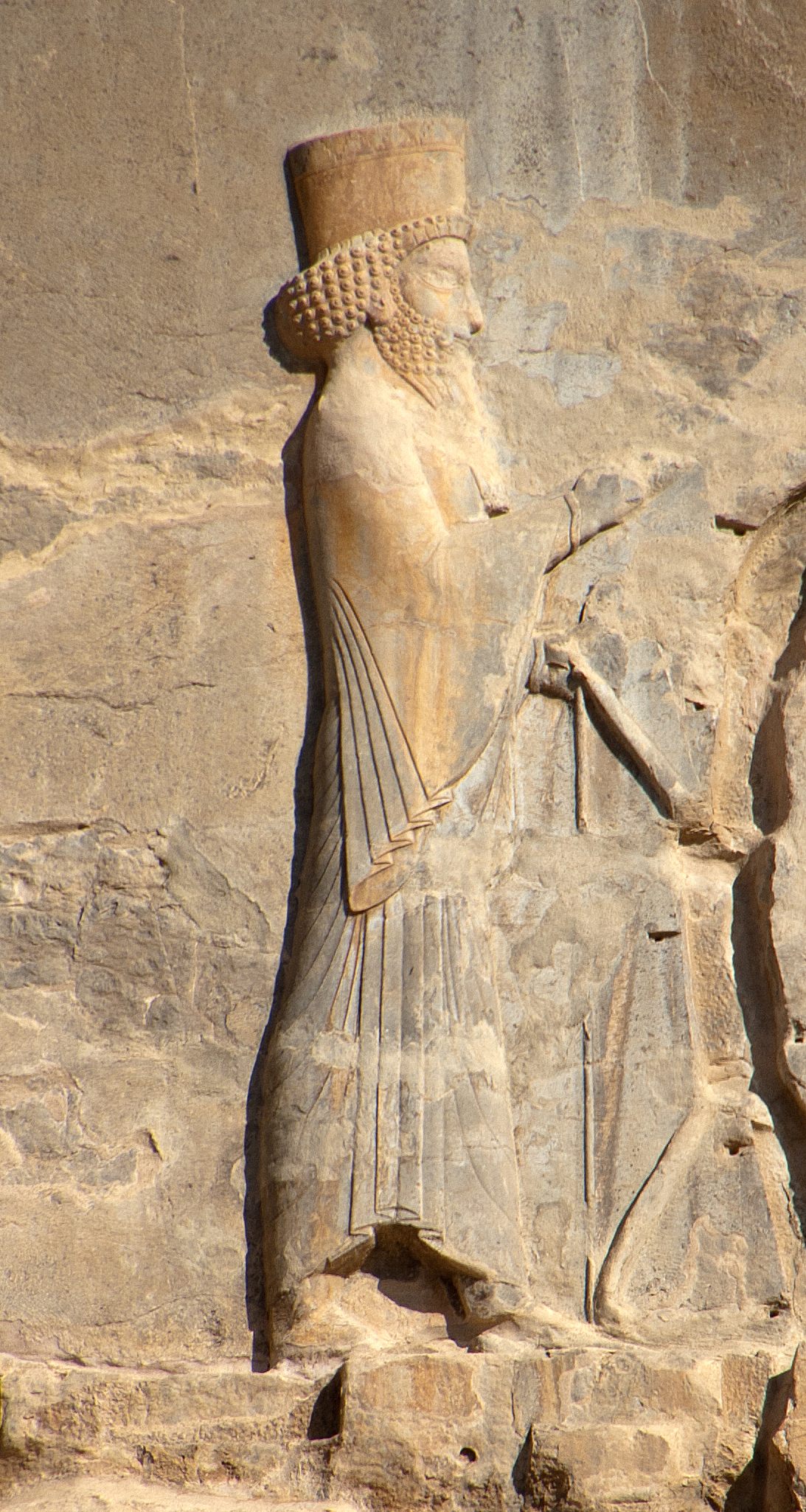
- The Rock relief of Artaxerxes II in Persepolis

King of Kings of the Achaemenid Empire
- Reign: 405/4–359/8 BC
- Predecessor: Darius II
- Successor: Artaxerxes III
- Born: Arses c. 436 BC (or 453 or 445 BC)
- Died: November 359 – April 358 BC
- Burial: Persepolis
- Spouse: Stateira
- Issue among others: Darius; Ariaspes; Artaxerxes III; Rhodogune; Atossa; Sisygambis; Amestris
- Dynasty: Achaemenid
- Father: Darius II
- Mother: Parysatis
- Religion: Ancient Iranian religion

Arses or Arsaces (c. 445–359/8 BC), known by his regnal name Artaxerxes II (Old Persian: 𐎠𐎼𐎫𐎧𐏁𐏂 Artaxšaçāʰ; Ancient Greek: Ἀρταξέρξης), was King of Kings of the Achaemenid Empire from 405/4 BC to 359/8 BC. He was the son and successor of Darius II (r. 423 – 405/4 BC) and his mother was Parysatis.

Soon after his accession, Artaxerxes II faced opposition from his younger brother Cyrus the Younger, who assembled an army composed of troops from his Lydian and Ionian satrapies as well as Greek mercenaries in his bid for the throne. The forces of the brothers clashed at Cunaxa in 401 BC, which resulted in the defeat and death of Cyrus. Following this, Artaxerxes II had to contend with several other revolts; a revolt by Evagoras I (r. 411–374 BC) in Cyprus between 391–380 BC, by the Phoenicians in c. 380 BC, and most importantly, the revolts by the western satraps (known as the Great Satraps' Revolt) in the 360s and 350s BC, led by distinguished figures such as Datames, Ariobarzanes, and Autophradates.

The rulers of the Parthian Empire notably considered Artaxerxes II their progenitor.

== Name and etymology ==
The given name of Artaxerxes II was, as rendered in Greek, Arses (Ἄρσης; Babylonian: Aršu), derived from the Old Persian *Ṛšā- ("man", "hero"). He was also widely known by the hypocorism Aršak, which is attested in several Greek forms including Arsikas (Plutarch), Arsakas and Arsaces (Persica). From Arsaces also derives the name of the Arsacid dynasty, which ruled the Parthian Empire and claimed descent from Artaxerxes II himself.

Artaxerxēs (Αρταξέρξης) is the Greek rendition of the Old Persian Artaxšaçā ("whose reign is through truth"). It is known in other languages as: Elamite Ir-tak-ik-ša-iš-ša, Ir-da-ik-ša-iš-ša; Akkadian Ar-ta-ʾ-ḫa-šá-is-su; Middle Persian Ardaxšēr and New Persian Ardašīr.

Greek authors gave Artaxerxes II the epithet "Mnemon" (Ancient Greek: Μνήμων; Old Persian: abiataka), meaning "remembering" or "having a good memory." This has been interpreted as the Greek rendering of Old Persian Vohuman, thus, indicating his devotion to Vohu Manah.

== Historiography ==
The life and reign of Artaxerxes II is attested mostly in classical Greek sources, which generally focus on the history of the western front. However, due to Artaxerxes II's younger brother Cyrus the Younger's recruiting many Greeks during the latter's rebellion, the reign of Artaxerxes II is well documented until Cyrus' death at the Battle of Cunaxa in 401 BC. Following that date, information on the rest of Artaxerxes II's reign becomes much more sparse.

Plutarch, when writing his Life of Artaxerxes II, used Ctesias, Dinon, Xenophon, and a few others as references. Plutarch's is the only ancient biography of an Achaemenid king. According to the modern historian Carsten Binder, Plutarch's work is an "eloquent but hardly reliable source of information" and it "should be treated with the greatest caution."

== Background and early life ==
Arsaces was the eldest son of Darius II, who ruled the Persian Achaemenid Empire from 424 to 405/4 BC. His mother was Parysatis, a half-sister of Darius II. His age at death is variously given as 86 (Lucian) and 94 (Dinon) years, which would place his birth around 453 or 445 BC. Briant simply notes that Arses was born before his father's accession in 424, while another author states that he was "at least in his late seventies in the early 360s". Darius II and Parysatis had thirteen children, most of whom died prematurely. Thus the only known full siblings of Arsaces were his younger brothers Cyrus, Ostanes, Oxathres, and an older sister, Amestris.

With the exception of Arsaces and Cyrus, not much is known about the children of Darius II and Parysatis. Cyrus was most likely born in 424/423 BC, just after the accession of Darius II. In 408 BC, at the age of 15 or 16, Cyrus was appointed the satrap of Lydia, Greater Phrygia, and Cappadocia. He also succeeded Tissaphernes as the commander-in-chief of the Persian force stationed at Castolus, east of the city of Sardis. Cyrus was given the title of karanos (Old Iranian: *Karana), which greatly expanded his authority both politically and militarily, and allowed him to become largely autonomous.

Before his accession, Arsaces married Stateira, the daughter of the Persian nobleman Hydarnes, who was descended from Hydarnes, one of the seven Persian conspirators who overthrew the Pseudo-Smerdis. The marriage was part of a political alliance that Darius had sought during his early reign, due to facing opposition against his rule. Amestris was also married to Hydarnes' son Terituchmes, while Hydarnes was appointed the satrap of Hyrcania.

When Darius II was on his deathbed, Arsaces was by his side. According to Xenophon, Darius II summoned Cyrus, who arrived with Tissaphernes and 300 Greek hoplites. Plutarch, however, reports that it was Parysatis who summoned Cyrus, as she favoured him over Arsaces. He further adds that she attempted to convince Darius II to choose Cyrus as his heir, as the position was still vacant. Modern historians question Plutarch's account, and state that Arsaces must have already been chosen as heir previously, probably several years earlier.

During the coronation of Arsaces at the southern capital of Pasargadae, Cyrus allegedly attempted to have his brother assassinated. The plan was exposed by Tissaphernes, but Cyrus was spared following the intervention of Parysatis and sent back to Asia Minor. The authenticity of this event is deemed uncertain by modern historians. According to Binder, the transition of power between Darius II and Arsaces was seemingly peaceful. Upon his investiture, Arsaces adopted the throne name of Artaxerxes.

== Reign ==
=== Dynastic conflict with Cyrus the Younger (401 BC) ===
Tissaphernes noted that Cyrus the Younger's claims to be on a military expedition to attack the Pisidians had many flaws that led him to believe that Cyrus was planning to revolt. These claims became realized when Cyrus began to seek political support for his campaign. Cyrus found support from Sparta, who sent soldiers to aid the campaign against Artaxerxes II. Notably, Cyrus found support from a Persian kingdom of Cilicia, who contributed to the effort through funds. During this time, due to Tissaphernes' reports, Artaxerxes II began to build up a force to contend with his younger brother's revolt.

By the time of Darius II's death, Cyrus had already been successful in defeating the Syrians and Cilicians and was commanding a large army made up of his initial supporters plus those who had joined him in Phrygia and beyond. Upon hearing of his father's death, Cyrus the Younger declared his claim to the throne, based on the argument that he was born to Darius and Parysatis after Darius had ascended to the throne, while Artaxerxes was born prior to Darius II's gaining the throne.

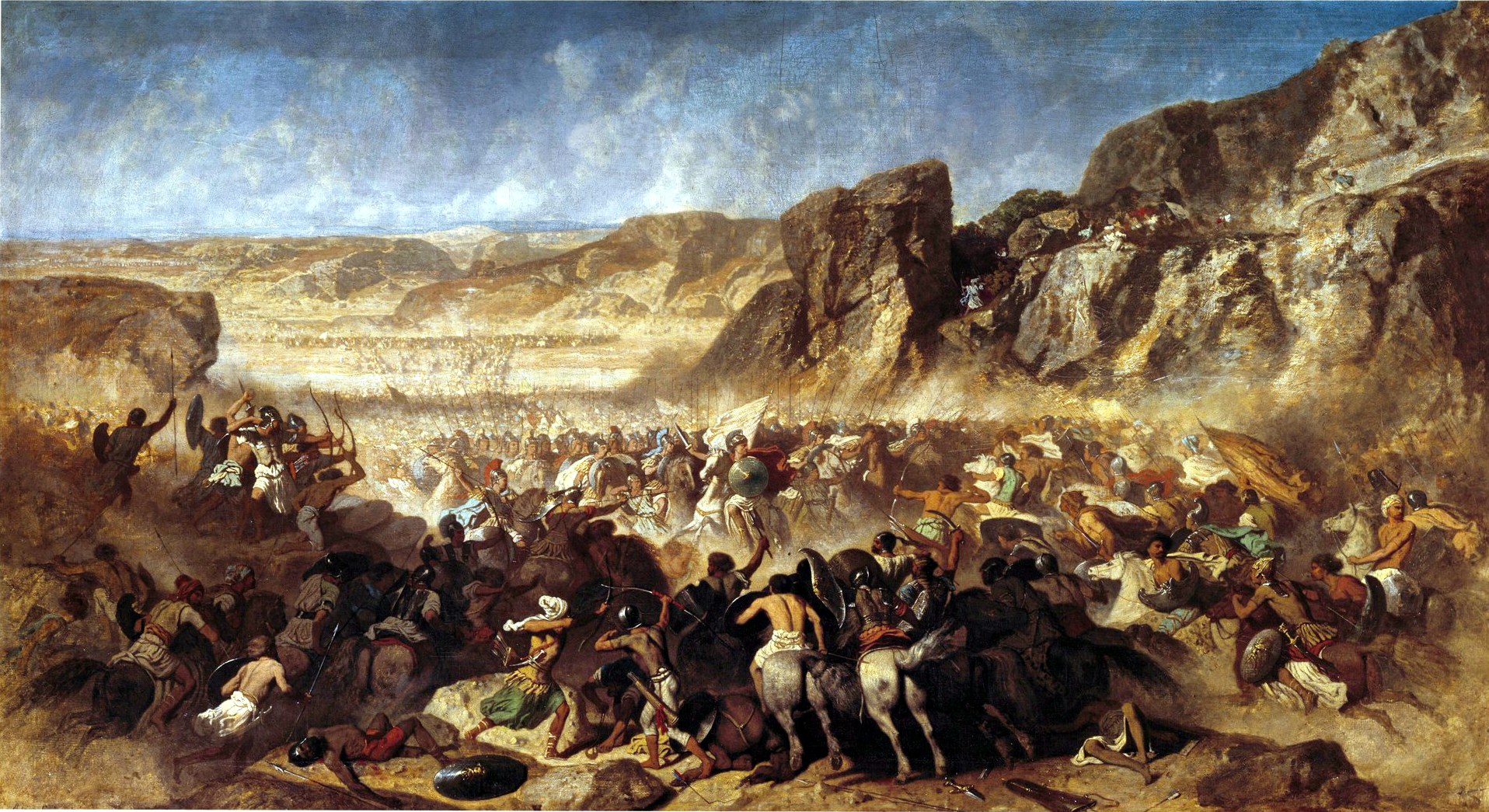
Retreat of the Ten Thousand, at the Battle of Cunaxa, Jean Adrien Guignet

Artaxerxes II initially wanted to resolve the conflict peacefully, but the negotiations fell through. Cyrus also ran into issues with the locals, who were loyal to Artaxerxes. Artaxerxes defended his position against his brother Cyrus the Younger, who with the aid of a large army of Greek mercenaries called the "Ten Thousand", attempted to usurp the throne. Though Cyrus' mixed army fought to a tactical victory at the Battle of Cunaxa in Babylon (401 BC), Cyrus himself was killed in the exchange by Mithridates, rendering his victory irrelevant. The Greek historian Xenophon, himself one of the leaders of the Greek troops, would later recount this battle in the Anabasis, focusing on the struggle of the now-stranded Greek mercenaries to return home.

=== Conflict against Sparta (396–387 BC) ===
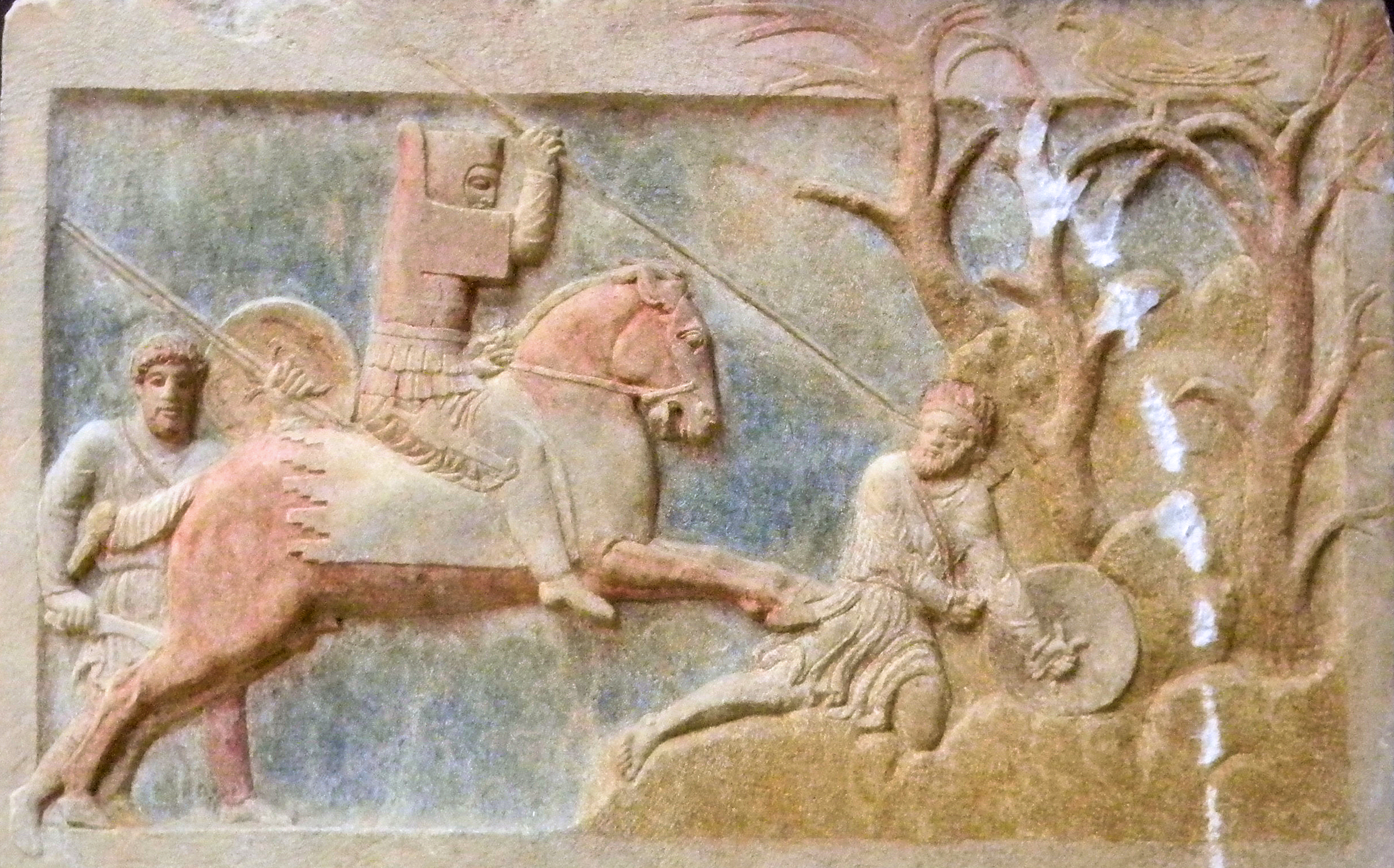
Armoured cavalry of Achaemenid Hellespontine Phrygia attacking a Greek psiloi at the time of Artaxerxes II and his Satrap Pharnabazus II, Altıkulaç Sarcophagus, early fourth century BC

Artaxerxes became involved in a war with Persia's erstwhile allies, the Spartans, during the Corinthian War (395–387 BC). The Spartans under their king Agesilaus II had started by invading Asia Minor in 396–395 BC. To redirect the Spartans' attention to Greek affairs, Artaxerxes subsidized their enemies through his envoy Timocrates of Rhodes; in particular, the Athenians, Thebans, and Corinthians received massive subsidies. Tens of thousands of darics, the main currency in Achaemenid coinage, were used to bribe these Greek states to start a war against Sparta. According to Plutarch, the Spartan king Agesilaus II said, upon leaving Asia Minor, "I have been driven out by ten thousand Persian archers," alluding to the archer depicted on Persian coins.

The Achaemenids, allied with Athens, managed to utterly destroy the Spartan fleet at the Battle of Cnidus (394 BC). After that, the Achaemenid satrap of Hellespontine Phrygia, Pharnabazus II, together with former Athenian admiral Conon, raided the coasts of Peloponnesia, putting increased pressure on the Spartans. This encouraged the resurgence of Athens, which started to bring back under her control the Greek cities of Asia Minor, thus worrying Artaxerxes II that his Athenian allies were becoming too powerful.

==== Final agreement with Sparta (387 BC) ====
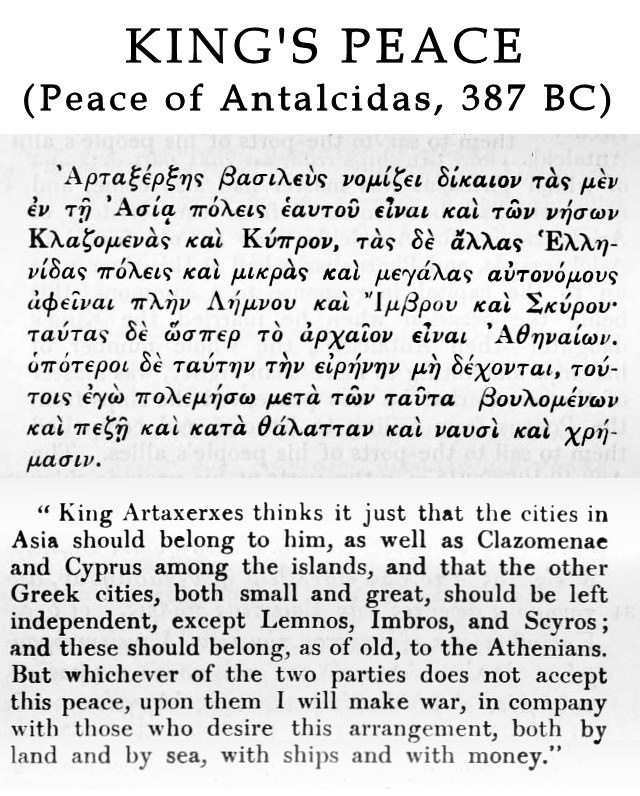
The King's Peace, promulgated by Artaxerxes II in 387 BC, put an end to the Corinthian War under the guarantee of the Achaemenid Empire.

In 386 BC, Artaxerxes II betrayed his allies and came to an arrangement with Sparta, and in the Treaty of Antalcidas, he forced his erstwhile allies to come to terms. This treaty restored control of the Greek cities of Ionia and Aeolis on the Anatolian coast to the Persians, while giving Sparta dominance on the Greek mainland. In 385 BC, Artaxerxes campaigned against the Cadusians.

=== Egypt campaign (373 BC) ===
Although successful against the Greeks, Artaxerxes had more trouble with the Egyptians, who had successfully revolted against him at the beginning of his reign. An attempt to reconquer Egypt in 373 BC under the command of Pharnabazus, satrap of Hellespontine Phrygia, was completely unsuccessful, but in his waning years, the Persians did manage to defeat a joint Egyptian–Spartan effort to conquer Phoenicia.

==== Unfolding of the Egyptian campaign ====
In 377 BC, Pharnabazus was reassigned by Artaxerxes II to help command a military expedition into rebellious Egypt, having proven his ability against the Spartans.

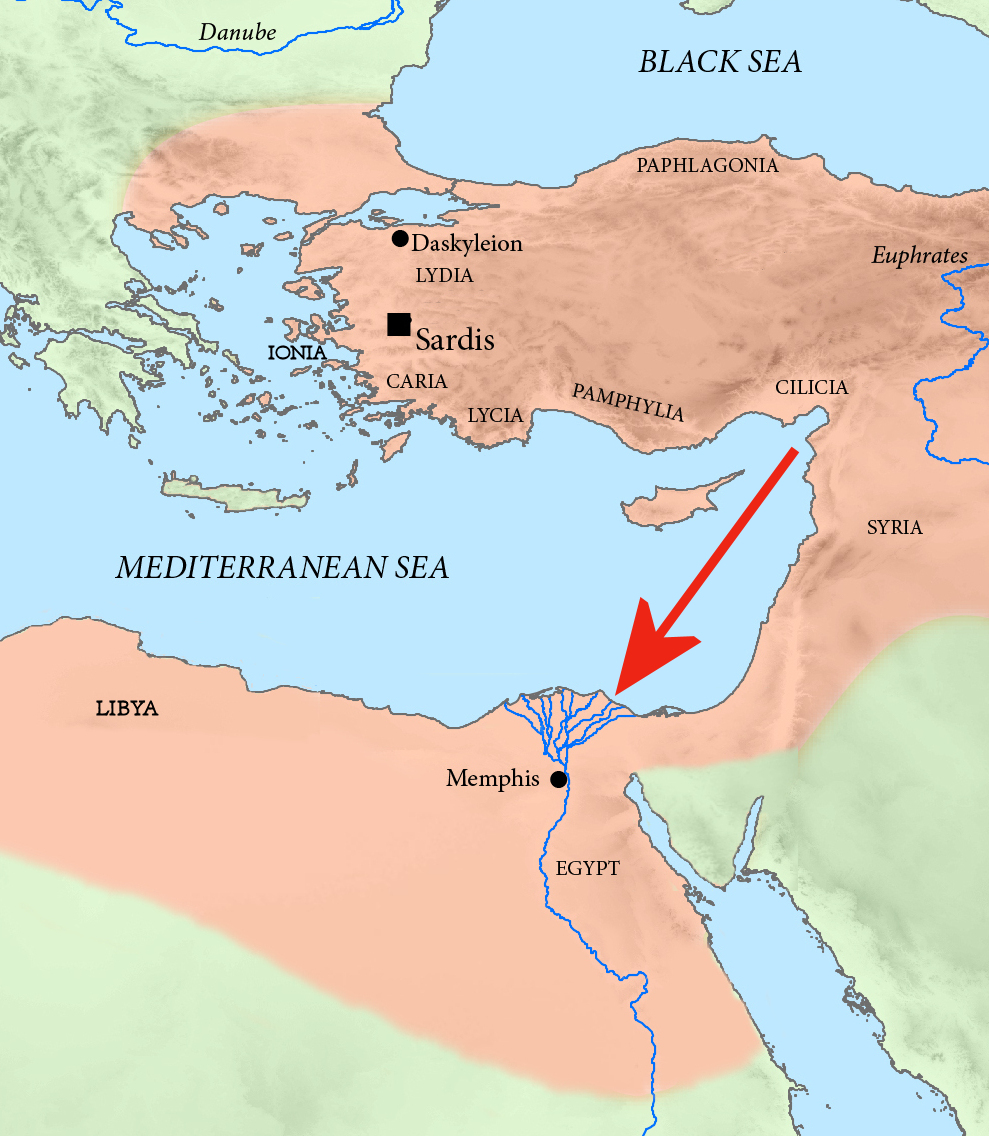
Achaemenid campaign of Pharnabazus II against Egypt in 373 BC

After four years of preparations in the Levant, Pharnabazus gathered an expeditionary force of 200,000 Persian troops, 300 triremes, 200 galleys, and 12,000 Greeks under Iphicrates. The Achaemenid Empire had also been applying pressure on Athens to recall the Greek general Chabrias, who was in the service of the Egyptians, but in vain. The Egyptian ruler Nectanebo I was thus supported by Athenian General Chabrias and his mercenaries.

The Achaemenid force landed in Egypt with the Athenian general Iphicrates near Mendes in 373 BC. The expedition force was too slow, giving time to the Egyptians to strengthen defenses. Pharnabazus and Iphicrates appeared before Pelusium, but retired without attacking it, Nectanebo I, king of Egypt, having added to its former defences by laying the neighboring lands under water, and blocking up the navigable channels of the Nile by embankments. (Diodorus Siculus xv. 42; Cornelius Nepos, Iphicrates c. 5.) Fortifications on the Pelusiac branch of the Nile ordered by Nectanebo forced the enemy fleet to seek another way to sail up the Nile. Eventually the fleet managed to find its way up the less-defended Mendesian branch. At this point, the mutual distrust that had arisen between Iphicrates and Pharnabazus prevented the enemy from reaching Memphis. Then, the annual Nile flood and the Egyptian defenders' resolve to defend their territory turned what had initially appeared as certain defeat for Nectanebo I and his troops into a complete victory.

After several weeks, the Persians and their Greek mercenaries under Iphicrates had to re-embark. The expedition against Egypt had failed. It was the end of the career of Pharnabazus, who was now over 70 years old. Pharnabazus was replaced by Datames to lead a second expedition to Egypt, but he failed and then started the "Satraps' Revolt" against the Great King.

=== Revolt of the Satraps (372–362 BC) ===
The Achaemenid defeat in Egypt led to unrest among the Achaemenid nobility. From 372 BC, many western satrapies of the Achaemenid Empire started to rebel against Artaxerxes II, in the Great Satraps' Revolt, starting with the powerful satrap Datames. Following the failure of Pharnabazus II in Egypt, Datames had been entrusted by the Persian king with the chief command of a force designed for the recovery of Egypt, but the machinations of his enemies at the Persian court, and the risks to which he was in consequence exposed, induced him to change his plan, and throw off his allegiance to the king. He withdrew with the troops under his command into Cappadocia, and made common cause with the other satraps who were revolting from Persia.

The Pharaoh Nectanebo provided financial support to the rebelling satraps and re-established ties with both Sparta and Athens. Artaxerxes II finally quashed the revolt of the satraps by 362 BC.

=== Peace mediation in the Theban–Spartan War (368–366 BC) ===
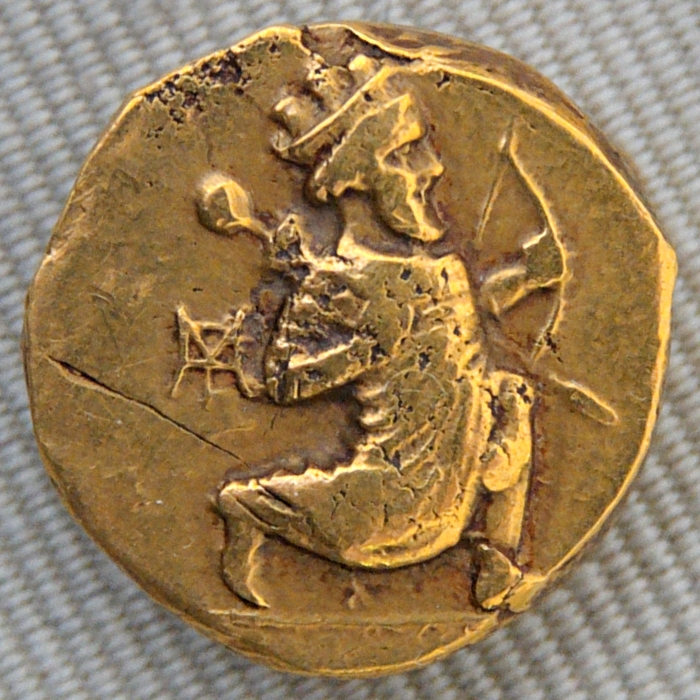
Daric of Artaxerxes II

Artaxerxes again attempted to mediate in conflicts between the Greek city-states at the time of the Theban hegemony, especially the Theban–Spartan War. He sent Philiscus of Abydos, a hyparch (vice-regent) and military commander of the Achaemenid satrap Ariobarzanes, to Delphi in order to help the Greek negotiate peace. The objective of Philicus of Abydos was such to help broker a Common Peace between the Greek belligerents reunited at Delphi. The negotiation collapsed when Thebes refused to return Messenia to the Spartans.

Before returning to Abydos, Philicus used Achaemenid funds to finance an army for the Spartans, suggesting that he was acting in support of the Spartans from the beginning. With the Achaemenid financing of a new army, Sparta was able to continue the war. Among the mercenaries whom he had recruited, Philiscus gave 2,000 to the Spartans. He also probably provided funds to the Athenians and promised them, on behalf of the King, to help them recover the Chersonese militarily. Both Philiscus and Ariobarzanes were made citizens of Athens, a remarkable honor suggesting important services rendered to the city-state.

During autumn of 367 BCE, first the Spartans, soon followed by the Athenians, the Arcadians, the Argives, the Eleans, the Thebans, and other Greek city-states, sent envoys to Susa in attempts to obtain the support of Achaemenid king Artaxerxes II in the Greek conflict. The Achaemenid king proposed a new peace treaty, this time highly tilted in favour of Thebes, which required Messenia to remain independent and that the Athenian fleet to be dismantled. This Peace proposal was rejected by most Greek parties except Thebes.

Sparta and Athens, dissatisfied with the Persian king's support of Thebes, decided to provide careful military support to the opponents of the Achaemenid king. Athens and Sparta provided support for the revolted satraps, in particular Ariobarzanes. Sparta sent a force to Ariobarzanes under an aging Agesilaus II, while Athens sent a force under Timotheus, which was however diverted when it became obvious that Ariobarzanes had entered frontal conflict with the Achaemenid king. An Athenian mercenary force under Chabrias was also sent to the Egyptian Pharaoh Tachos, who was also fighting against the Achaemenid king.

== Building projects ==
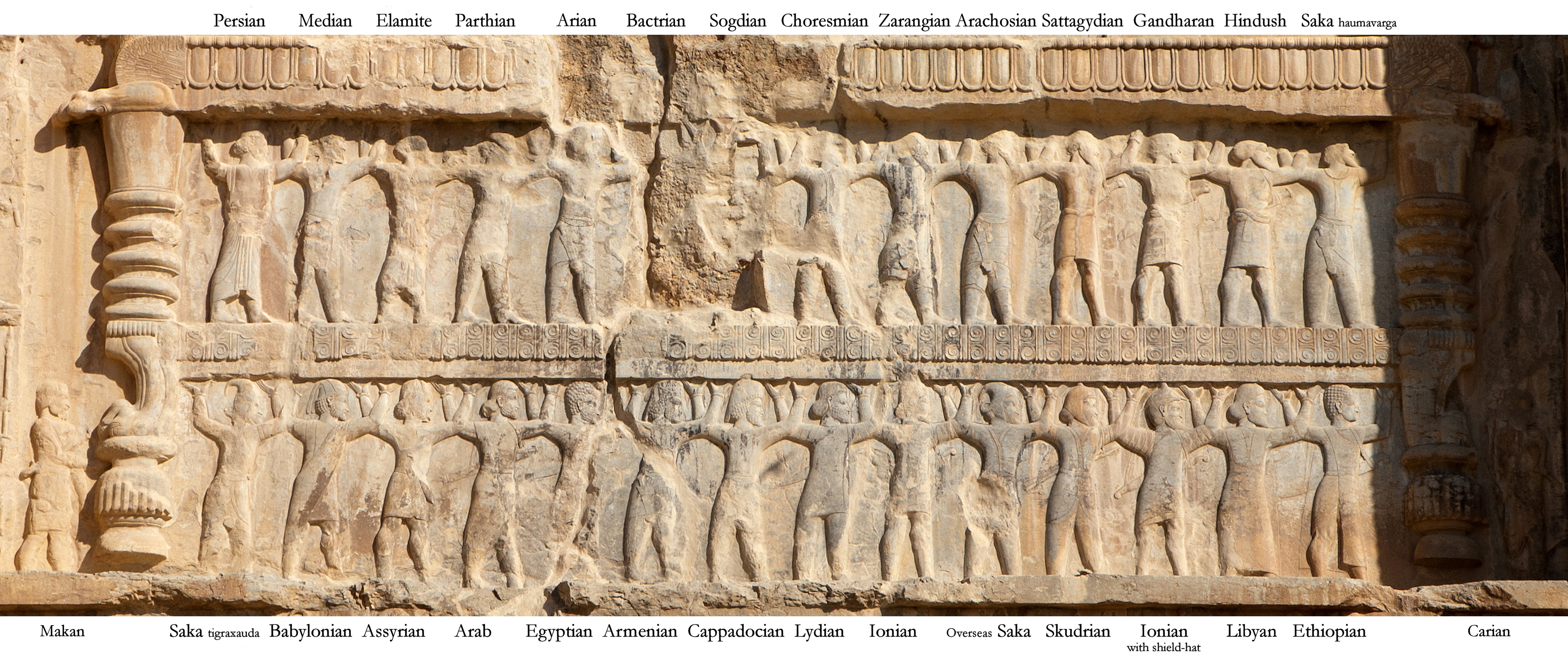
Ethnicities of the soldiers of the Empire, on the tomb of Artaxerxes II. On the lintel over each figure appears a trilingual inscription describing each ethnicity. These are known collectively as "Inscription A2Pa".

Much of Artaxerxes's wealth was spent on building projects. He restored the Palace of Darius I at Susa, and also the fortifications; including a strong redoubt at the south-east corner of the enclosure and gave Ecbatana a new apadana and sculptures.

=== Tomb at Persepolis ===
The tomb of Artaxerxes II is located at Persepolis, and was built on the model of his predecessors at Naqsh-e Rustam. On the upper register of the tomb appear reliefs of the Emperor, supported by the soldiers of all ethnicities of the Empire. On the lintel over each figure appears a trilingual inscription describing each ethnicity. These are known collectively as "Inscription A2Pa".

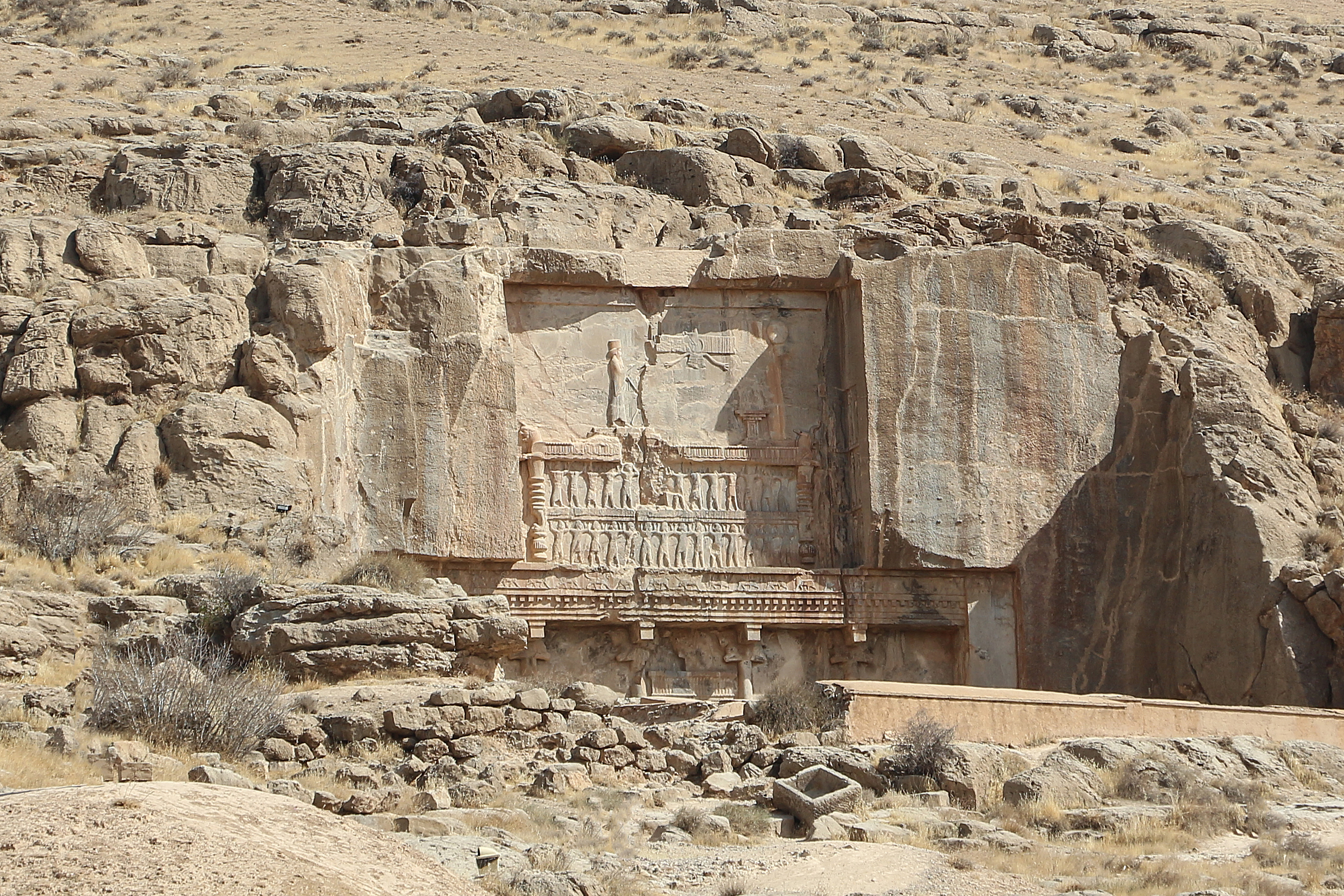
Tomb of Artaxerxes II in Persepolis.

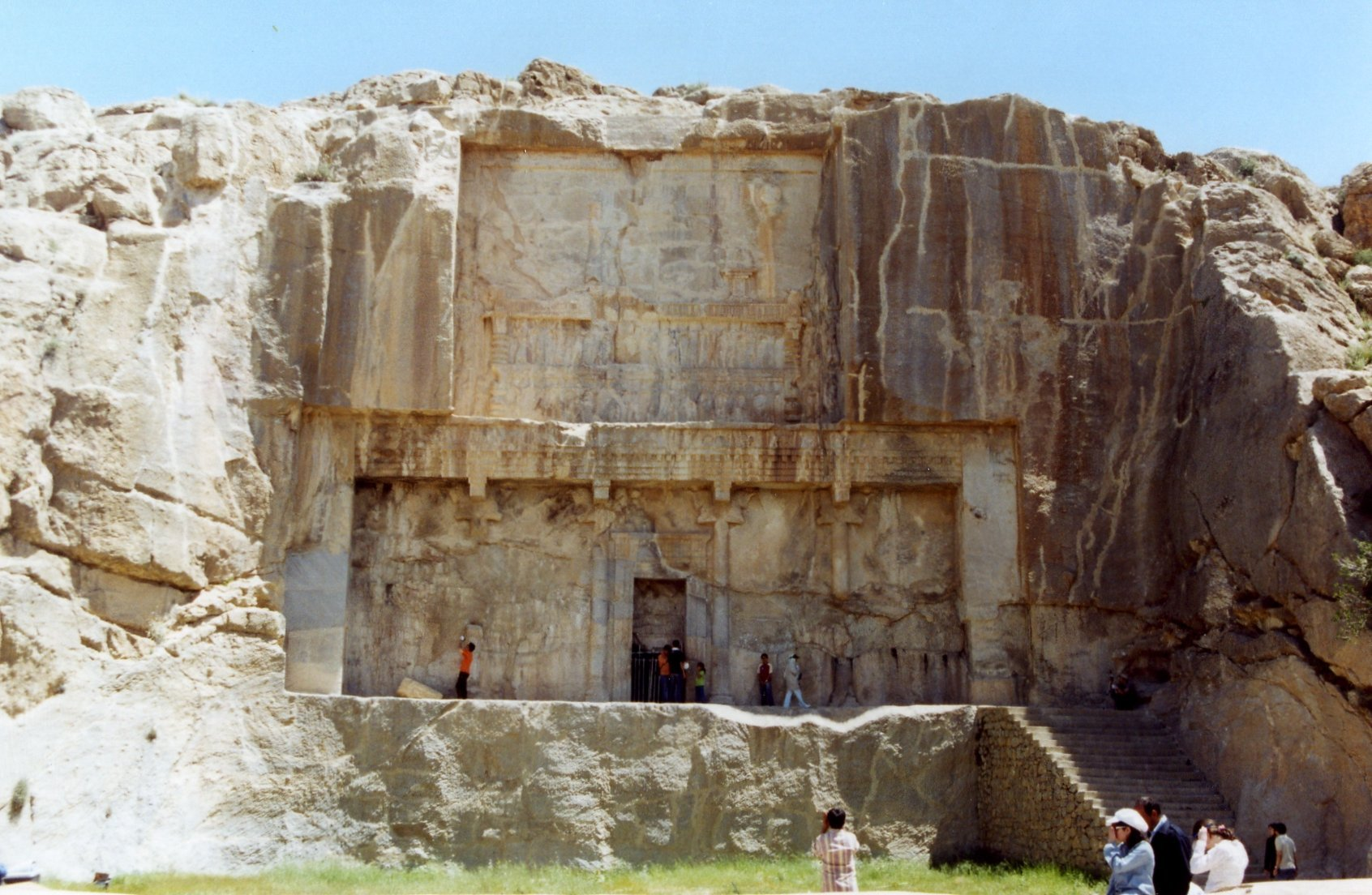
Tomb of Artaxerxes II in Persepolis.

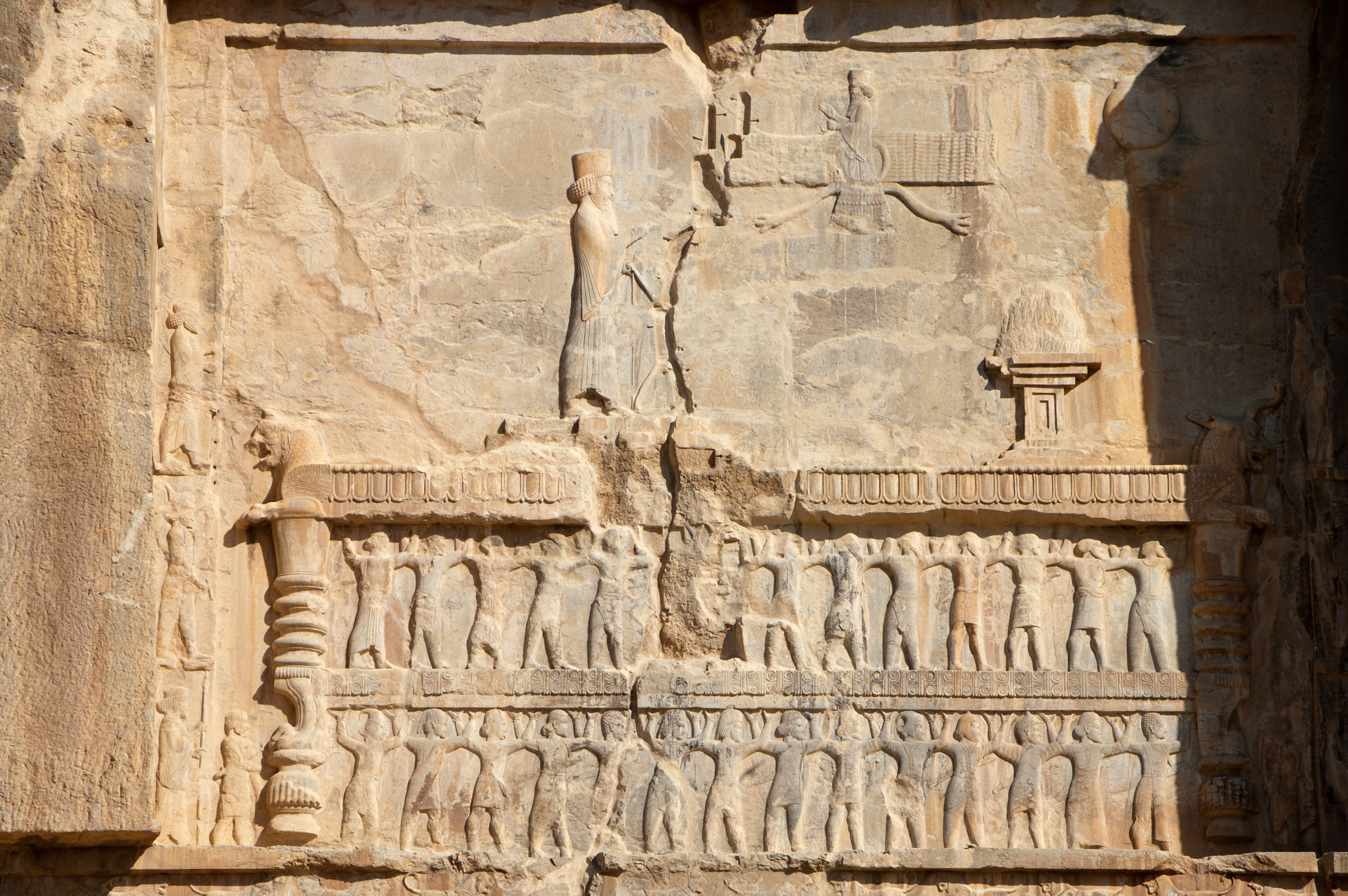
Upper Relief of the tomb of Artaxerxes II.

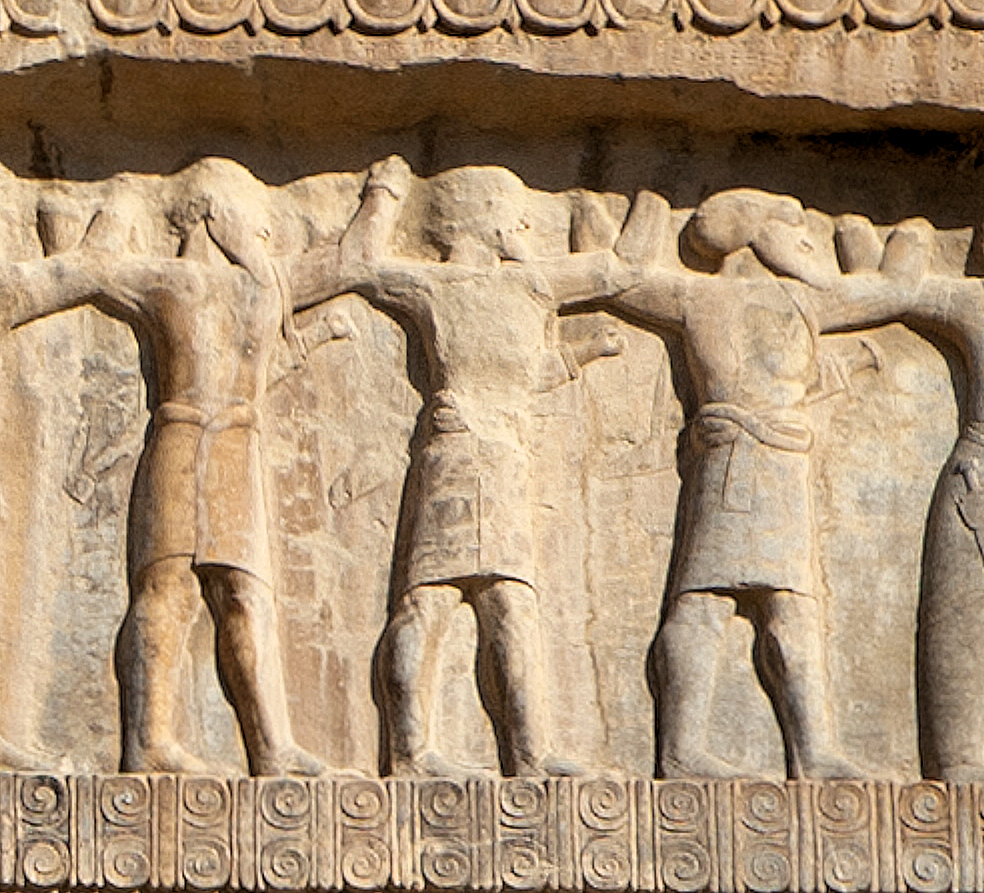
Soldiers of many ethnicities on the upper relief

== Religious policies ==
Since the reign of Darius the Great (r. 522–486 BC), Achaemenid inscriptions make mention of unnamed gods alongside Ahura Mazda, who was considered the supreme god of the Zoroastrian pantheon by the royal family. It was first under Artaxerxes II that the identities of these gods were uncovered. In a trilingual inscription at Susa, he invokes the deities Anahita and Mithra alongside Ahura Mazda.

Artaxerxes II was thus the first known Achaemenid king to recognize Anahita, who was the divinity of "the Waters" and hence associated with fertility, healing and wisdom. He promoted the worship of Anahita, erecting temples and statues of the goddess across the empire. This included the cities of Ecbatana, Susa, and Babylon.

The temple of Anahita in Istakhr was also most likely founded by Artaxerxes II. At the start of the 3rd century AD, the temple was repaired and adorned by the Persian Sasanian family, who acted as the hereditary caretakers of the temple.

== Legacy ==
The Persian Empire under Artaxerxes II was viewed as a political power that had many unfortunate complications, such as the many wars with Greece. One aspect of his legacy which would have great influence upon his successors was his conflict with Cyrus the Younger. This conflict was remembered due to the power vacuum that followed, allowing the Satrap Revolt and the rebellion of Egypt. Artaxerxes II was also remembered for his works to restore monuments of his predecessors. His largest restoration was that of the Palace of Darius in Susa. He would also be remembered for his tomb in Persepolis.

The image of Artaxerxes from contemporary foreign sources depicts him in a similar light to his image among those in the Achaemenid Empire. The Greek portrayal highlights his long rule with many conflicts and shortcomings of Artaxerxes II in his ability to control his empire. Greek sources also focus on his problems in his court with his harem and eunuchs, as in Claudius Aelianus's accounts of Aspasia of Phocaea and Tiridates. Greek sources portray Artaxerxes II as sad in his reign.

== Identification ==
The Jewish high priest Johanan is mentioned in the Elephantine papyri dated to 407 BC, i.e., during Darius II's reign, and is also mentioned in Ezra 6:10 after the reign of Darius (Ezra 6:1) and during the rule of Artaxerxes (Ezra 7:1), thereby supporting the chronological sequence.

Amongst others, it has been suggested that Artaxerxes II was the Ahasuerus mentioned in the Book of Esther. Plutarch in his Lives (AD 75) records alternative names Oarses and Arsicas for Artaxerxes II Mnemon given by Deinon (c. 360–340 BC) and Ctesias (Artexerxes II's physician) respectively. These derive from the Persian name Khshayarsha as do "Ahasuerus" ("(Arta)Xerxes") and the hypocoristicon "Arshu" for Artaxerxes II found on a contemporary inscription (LBAT 162). These sources thus arguably identify Ahasuerus as Artaxerxes II in light of the names used in the Hebrew and Greek sources and accords with the contextual information from Pseudo-Hecataeus and Berossus as well as agreeing with Al-Tabari and Masudi's placement of events. The 13th century Syriac historian Bar-Hebraeus in his Chronography, also identifies Ahasuerus as Artaxerxes II citing the sixth century AD historian John of Ephesus.

== Issue ==
Artaxerxes II is reported to have had a number of wives. His main wife was Stateira, until she was poisoned by Artaxerxes's mother Parysatis in about 400 BC. Artaxerxes II is said to have more than 115 sons from 350 wives.

By Stateira
Darius (probably aged over 50 in 366 BC)
Ariaspes or Ariarathes
Ochus (Artaxerxes III)
Rhodogune, wife of satrap Orontes I
Atossa, wife of Artaxerxes II
Sisygambis, mother of Darius III

By other wives
Arsames
Mithridates
Phriapatius(?), probable ancestor of Arsacids
Amestris, wife of Artaxerxes II
Apama, wife of Pharnabazus
Ocha, mother of an unnamed wife of Artaxerxes III
The unnamed wife of Tissaphernes
112 other unnamed sons

== See also ==
- The Anabasis
- Ten Thousand (Greek)

== Sources ==
- Binder, Carsten (2008). Plutarchs Vita des Artaxerxes (in German). Berlin: Walter de Gruyter. doi:10.1515/9783110209945. ISBN 978-3-11-020269-4.
- Boyce, Mary; Grenet, Frantz (1991). Beck, Roger (ed.). A History of Zoroastrianism, Zoroastrianism under Macedonian and Roman Rule. Leiden: Brill. ISBN 978-90-04-29391-5.
- Boyce, Mary; Chaumont, M. L.; Bier, C. (1985). "Anāhīd". In Yarshater, Ehsan (ed.). Encyclopædia Iranica. Vol. I/9: Alp Arslan–ʿAbd-al-Hamīd. London and New York: Routledge & Kegan Paul. pp. 1003–1011. ISBN 978-0-71009-098-0.
- Briant, Pierre (2002). From Cyrus to Alexander: A History of the Persian Empire. Eisenbrauns. ISBN 978-1-57506-031-6.
- Brijder, Herman (2014). Nemrud Dağı: Recent Archaeological Research and Conservation Activities in the Tomb Sanctuary on Mount Nemrud. Walter de Gruyter. ISBN 978-1-61451-713-9.
- Brosius, Maria (2020). A History of Ancient Persia: The Achaemenid Empire. Wiley-Blackwell. ISBN 978-1-444-35092-0.
- Chahin, M. (2001). The Kingdom of Armenia: A History. Psychology Press. ISBN 978-0-7007-1452-0.
- Clark, Jessica H.; Turner, Brian (2018). Brill's Companion to Military Defeat in Ancient Mediterranean Society. Brill. ISBN 978-90-04-29858-3.
- Dandamaev, Muhammad A. (1989). A Political History of the Achaemenid Empire. Translated by Vogelsang, W. J. Brill. ISBN 978-90-04-09172-6.
- Facella, Margherita (21 July 2021) [11 June 2021]. "Orontids". In Daniel, Elton (ed.). Encyclopaedia Iranica Online. Leiden: Brill. doi:10.1163/2330-4804_EIRO_COM_362451. ISSN 2330-4804.
- Frye, R. N. (1983). "The political history of Iran under the Sasanians". In Yarshater, Ehsan (ed.). The Cambridge History of Iran: The Seleucid, Parthian and Sasanian Periods. Vol. 3(1). Cambridge: Cambridge University Press. ISBN 0-521-20092-X.
- Garsoian, Nina (2012) [2004]. "Armeno-Iranian relations in the pre-Islamic period". In Yarshater, Ehsan (ed.). Encyclopædia Iranica (Online ed.). Encyclopædia Iranica Foundation.
- Gershevitch, Ilya, ed. (1985). The Cambridge History of Iran, Volume 2: The Median and Achaemenian periods. Cambridge University Press. ISBN 978-0-521-20091-2.
- Grimal, Nicolas (1992). A History of Ancient Egypt. Oxford: Blackwell Books. ISBN 978-0-631-19396-8.
- Jacobs, Bruno; Rollinger, Robert (2021). A Companion to the Achaemenid Persian Empire. John Wiley & Sons. ISBN 978-1-119-17428-8.
- Kuhrt, A. (2013). The Persian Empire: A Corpus of Sources from the Achaemenid Period. Routledge. ISBN 978-1-136-01694-3.
- Lewis, Sian (2006). Ancient Tyranny. Edinburgh University Press. ISBN 978-0-7486-2125-5.
- Lloyd, Alan B. (1994). "Egypt, 404–332 B.C.". The Fourth Century B.C. The Cambridge Ancient History. Vol. VI. ISBN 0-521-23348-8.
- Llewellyn-Jones, Lloyd (2017). "The Achaemenid Empire". In Daryaee, Touraj (ed.). King of the Seven Climes: A History of the Ancient Iranian World (3000 BCE - 651 CE). UCI Jordan Center for Persian Studies. ISBN 978-0-692-86440-1.
- Llewellyn-Jones, Lloyd (2013). King and Court in Ancient Persia 559 to 331 BCE. Edinburgh University Press. ISBN 978-0-7486-7711-5.
- Marek, Christian (2016). In the Land of a Thousand Gods: A History of Asia Minor in the Ancient World. Princeton University Press. ISBN 978-0-691-15979-9.
- Olbrycht, Marek Jan (2021). Early Arsakid Parthia (ca. 250-165 B.C.). Brill. ISBN 978-90-04-46075-1.
- Osborne, Michael J. (1973). "Orontes". Historia: Zeitschrift für Alte Geschichte. 22 (4): 515–551. ISSN 0018-2311. JSTOR 4435366.
- Osborne, Michael J. (1971). "Athens and Orontes". Annual of the British School at Athens. 66: 297–321. doi:10.1017/S0068245400019213. ISSN 2045-2403. JSTOR 30103238. S2CID 163834297.
- Podrazik, Michał (2017). "Rebellions against the Great King in the Achaemenid Empire: Some Remarks". Anabasis. 8: 277–291.
- Russell, James R. (1987). Zoroastrianism in Armenia. Harvard University, Department of Near Eastern Languages and Civilizations and National Association for Armenian Studies and Research. ISBN 978-0-674-96850-9.
- Ruzicka, Stephen (2012). Trouble in the West: Egypt and the Persian Empire, 525–332 BC. Oxford University Press. pp. 1–311. ISBN 978-0-19-976662-8.
- Schmitt, Rüdiger (2004). "Hydarnes". In Yarshater, Ehsan (ed.). Encyclopædia Iranica. Vol. XII/6: Human migration II–Illuminationism. London and New York: Routledge & Kegan Paul. pp. 588–590. ISBN 978-0-933273-80-1.
- Schmitt, Rüdiger (2002). "Orontes". In Yarshater, Ehsan (ed.). Encyclopædia Iranica (Online ed.). Encyclopædia Iranica Foundation.
- Schmitt, Rüdiger (1993). "Cyrus vi. Cyrus the Younger". In Yarshater, Ehsan (ed.). Encyclopædia Iranica. Vol. VI/5: Čūb-bāzī–Daf(f) and Dāyera. London and New York: Routledge & Kegan Paul. pp. 524–526. ISBN 978-1-56859-003-5.
- Schmitt, R. (1986a). "Artaxerxes". In Yarshater, Ehsan (ed.). Encyclopædia Iranica. Vol. II/6: Art in Iran I–ʿArūż. London and New York: Routledge & Kegan Paul. pp. 654–655. ISBN 978-0-71009-106-2.
- Schmitt, R. (1986b). "Artaxerxes II". In Yarshater, Ehsan (ed.). Encyclopædia Iranica. Vol. II/6: Art in Iran I–ʿArūż. London and New York: Routledge & Kegan Paul. pp. 656–658. ISBN 978-0-71009-106-2.
- Schmitt, R. (1986c). "Artaxerxes III". In Yarshater, Ehsan (ed.). Encyclopædia Iranica. Vol. II/6: Art in Iran I–ʿArūż. London and New York: Routledge & Kegan Paul. pp. 658–659. ISBN 978-0-71009-106-2.
- Shayegan, M. Rahim (2016). "The Arsacids and Commagene". In Curtis, Vesta Sarkhosh; Pendleton, Elizabeth J.; Alram, Michael; Daryaee, Touraj (eds.). The Parthian and Early Sasanian Empires: Adaptation and Expansion. Oxbow Books. ISBN 978-1-78570-208-2.
- Stylianou, P.J. (1998). "Commentary". A Historical Commentary on Diodorus Siculus, Book 15. Oxford University Press. ISBN 978-0-19-815239-2.
- Troxell, Hyla A. (1981). "Orontes, Satrap of Mysia". Schweizerische Numismatische Rundschau. 60: 27–41. ISSN 0035-4163.
- Waters, Matt (2017). Ctesias' Persica in Its Near Eastern Context. University of Wisconsin Pres. ISBN 978-0-299-31090-5.
- Waters, Matt (2014). Ancient Persia: A Concise History of the Achaemenid Empire, 550–330 BCE. Cambridge University Press. ISBN 978-0-521-25369-7.
- Wiesehöfer, Joseph (1986). "Ardašīr I: History". In Yarshater, Ehsan (ed.). Encyclopædia Iranica. Vol. II/4: Architecture IV–Armenia and Iran IV. London and New York: Routledge & Kegan Paul. pp. 371–376. ISBN 978-0-71009-104-8.

Artaxerxes II Achaemenid dynasty Born: c. 436 BC Died: c. 358 BC
| Preceded by Darius II | King of Kings of Persia; 404–359/8 BC | Succeeded by Artaxerxes III |
