= List of ancient Greek historians =

The entries in this list of ancient Greek historians span the Archaic, Classical, Hellenistic, Roman-era, and Byzantine periods.

== Archaic Greece ==
- Acusilaus
- Amelesagoras
- Cadmus of Miletus
- Hecataeus of Miletus
- Hellanicus of Lesbos
- Pherecydes of Athens
- Stesimbrotos of Thasos
- Xanthus (historian)

== Classical Greece ==
- Antiochus of Syracuse
- Callisthenes
- Cratippus of Athens
- Ctesias
- Dinon
- Duris of Samos
- Ephorus
- Eudemus of Rhodes
- Hellanicus of Lesbos
- Heracleides of Cyme
- Herodotus
- Philistus
- Theopompus
- Thucydides
- Xenophon
- Hellenica Oxyrhynchia

== Hellenistic Greece ==
- Abydenus
- Aesopus (historian)
- Agatharchides
- Agathocles (writers)
- Alexander Polyhistor
- Anticlides
- Antipater
- Antisthenes of Rhodes
- Aratus of Sicyon
- Artapanus of Alexandria
- Berossus
- Callixenus of Rhodes
- Cleitarchus
- Craterus (historian)
- Ctesicles
- Deinias of Argos
- Demetrius the Chronographer
- Diyllus
- Duris of Samos
- Euphantus
- Eupolemus
- Hecataeus of Abdera
- Hegesander (historian)
- Hegesias of Magnesia
- Hippobotus
- Jason of Cyrene
- Leon of Pella
- Manetho
- Marsyas of Pella
- Marsyas of Philippi
- Menander of Ephesus
- Neanthes of Cyzicus
- Nicander
- Paeon of Amathus
- Palaephatus
- Philinus of Agrigentum
- Philochorus
- Philostephanus
- Phylarchus
- Polybius
- Posidonius
- Satyrus the Peripatetic
- Sosicrates
- Theopompus
- Timaeus (historian)

== Roman Greece ==
- Gaius Acilius
- Acesander
- Alexander Lychnus
- Alexander Polyhistor
- Appian
- Arrian
- Zarmanochegas
- Caecilius of Calacte
- Callinicus (Sophist)
- Castor of Rhodes
- Dio Chrysostom
- Lucius Cincius Alimentus
- Criton of Heraclea
- Criton of Pieria
- Dexippus
- Cassius Dio
- Diocles of Peparethus
- Diodorus Siculus
- Dionysius of Halicarnassus
- Ephorus the Younger
- Herodian
- Hypsicrates (historian)
- Josephus
- Sextus Julius Africanus
- Memnon of Heraclea
- Nicias of Nicaea
- Nicolaus of Damascus
- Pamphile of Epidaurus
- Philo of Byblos
- Plutarch
- Polyaenus
- Polybius
- Posidonius
- Gaius Asinius Quadratus
- Strabo
- Thallus (historian)
- Theophanes of Mytilene

== Byzantine Empire ==
- Procopius
- Eusebius (Chronicon)
- Jerome (Chronicon)
- Agathias
