= Mining industry of Egypt =

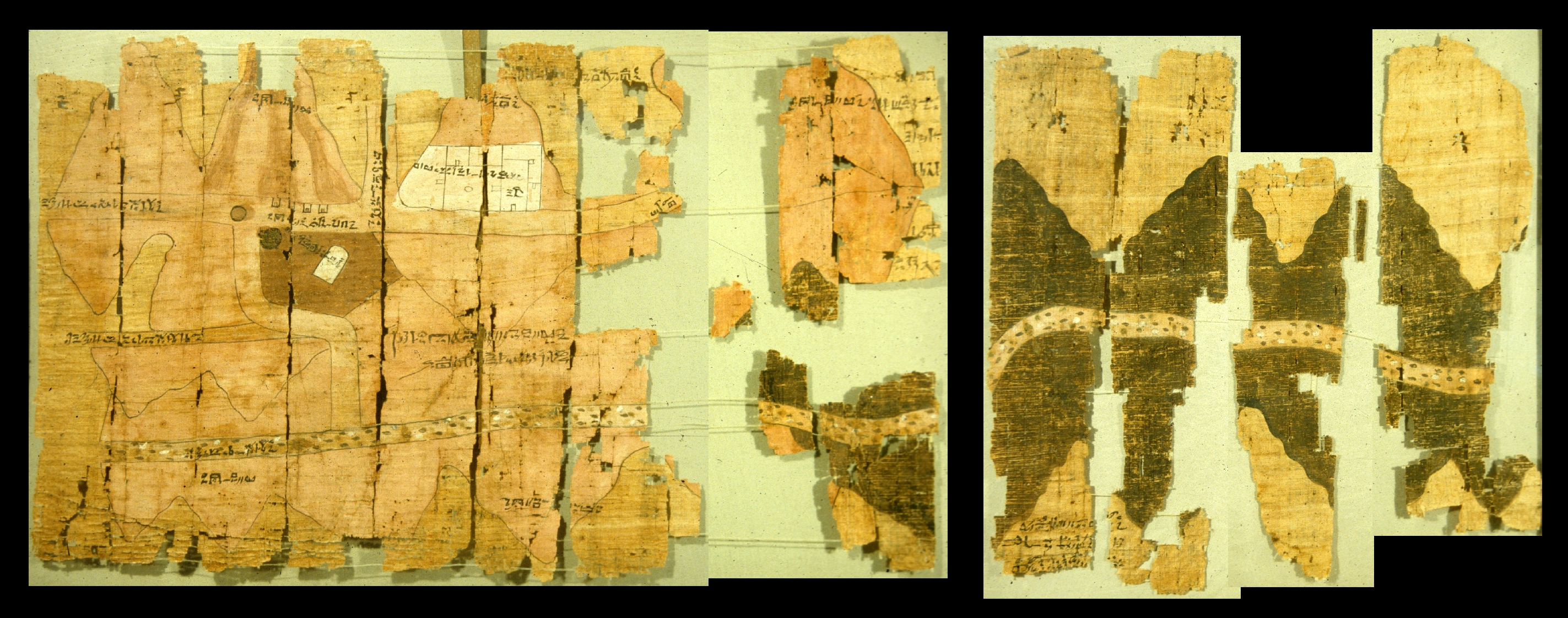
The Turin mining papyrus depicts mines in the Wadi Hammamat and is the oldest known map of its kind.

Mining in Egypt has had a long history that dates back to predynastic times. Active mining began in Egypt around 3000 BCE. Egypt has substantial mineral resources, including 48 million tons of tantalite (fourth largest in the world), 50 million tons of coal, and an estimated 6.7 million ounces of gold in the Eastern Desert. The total real value of minerals mined was about E£102 million (US$18.7 million) in 1986, up from E£60 million (US$11 million) in 1981. The chief minerals in terms of volume output were iron ore, phosphates, and salt. The quantities produced in 1986 were estimated at 2,048, 1,310, and 1,233 tons, respectively, compared with 2,139, 691, and 883 tons in 1981. In addition, minor amounts of asbestos (313 tons) and quartz (19 tons) were mined in 1986. Preliminary exploration in Sinai indicated the presence of zinc, tin, lead, and copper deposits. Private sector exploration and exploitation activities so far have been limited. Only recently, AngloGold Ashanti with its joint Venture Partner Thani Dubai and a Canadian listed exploration company, Alexander Nubia International have been undertaking exploration in Egypt's Eastern Desert with some success. Centamin Ltd., a mineral exploration company founded in Australia, started a massive mining project in Sukari Hill.

== History ==
Gold mining in Upper Egypt can be traced back to predynastic times, and the earliest map known in the world from the Ramesside Period dating to about 1160 BCE, shows the route to the gold mines in the Wadi Hammamat, Eastern Desert. The mines in Ancient Egypt were worked by slaves who worked under difficult conditions and were often beaten if they did not work hard enough. Gold mining started with alluvial workings in Egypt and was followed by shallow underground vein mining in Nubia about 1300 BCE, during the New Kingdom period. The methods of working included fire-setting to weaken rocks by thermal shock, a method described by Diodorus Siculus in his Bibliotheca historica written about 60 BCE.

The technique of quarrying granite and limestone was an advanced technology by the time the pyramids were being built. Marble, alabaster and diorite were used for making statues, basalt for making sarcophagi, and dolomite for hammers to work hard stones. A staggering amount of gold was found in the tomb of Tutankhamun, the only ancient Egyptian royal burial site to have been found in a relatively intact state. Ancient texts report the vast quantities of statutory gold, silver and bronze that was used in Egyptian temple ritual, but of these, only a single gold statue of the body of Amun, minus his arms, is known to have survived.

Precious and semi-precious stones that were extensively mined and worked as well included turquoise, beryl, amethyst, and malachite. Amethyst was incredibly rare in the ancient world, and was frequently mined during the Middle Kingdom at Wadi el-Hudi. Hathor was the miner's patron goddess, and her temples, statues or inscriptions were found in many rediscovered mining locations. A major temple to Hathor constructed by Seti II was found at the copper mines in Timna valley; another temple was discovered in Serabit el-Khadim, where turquoise was mined in antiquity, in an expedition led by Sir Flinders Petrie.

Egypt became a major gold-producer during the Old Kingdom and remained so for the next 1,500 years, with interruptions when the kingdom broke down. During the New Kingdom, the production of gold steadily increased, and mining became more intensive as new fields were developed. British historian Paul Johnson stated that it was gold rather than military power which sustained the Egyptian empire and made it the world power throughout the third quarter of the second millennium BCE. Most gold mines in Egypt today were exploited for high-grade gold (15 g/t gold or greater) by the ancient Egyptians; however, there has been limited exploration that applies modern day techniques where deposits can be viable based on gold grades as low as 0.5 g/t (provided there is sufficient tonnage and readily available infrastructure).

The earliest known beryl mine in the world is located at Mons Smaragdus in the mountain valley of Wadi Sikait, Eastern Desert. Its mining started during the Ptolemaic period, although most of the mining activities date to the Roman and Byzantine periods. All the other beryl mining sites such as Gebel Zabara, Wadi Umm Debaa and Wadi Gimal are Roman-Byzantine or Islamic (mid-6th century onward) in date. Beryl mining ceased in Egypt when the Spanish Empire discovered superior-quality emeralds in Colombia in the 16th century.

== Modern technology and gold exploration ==
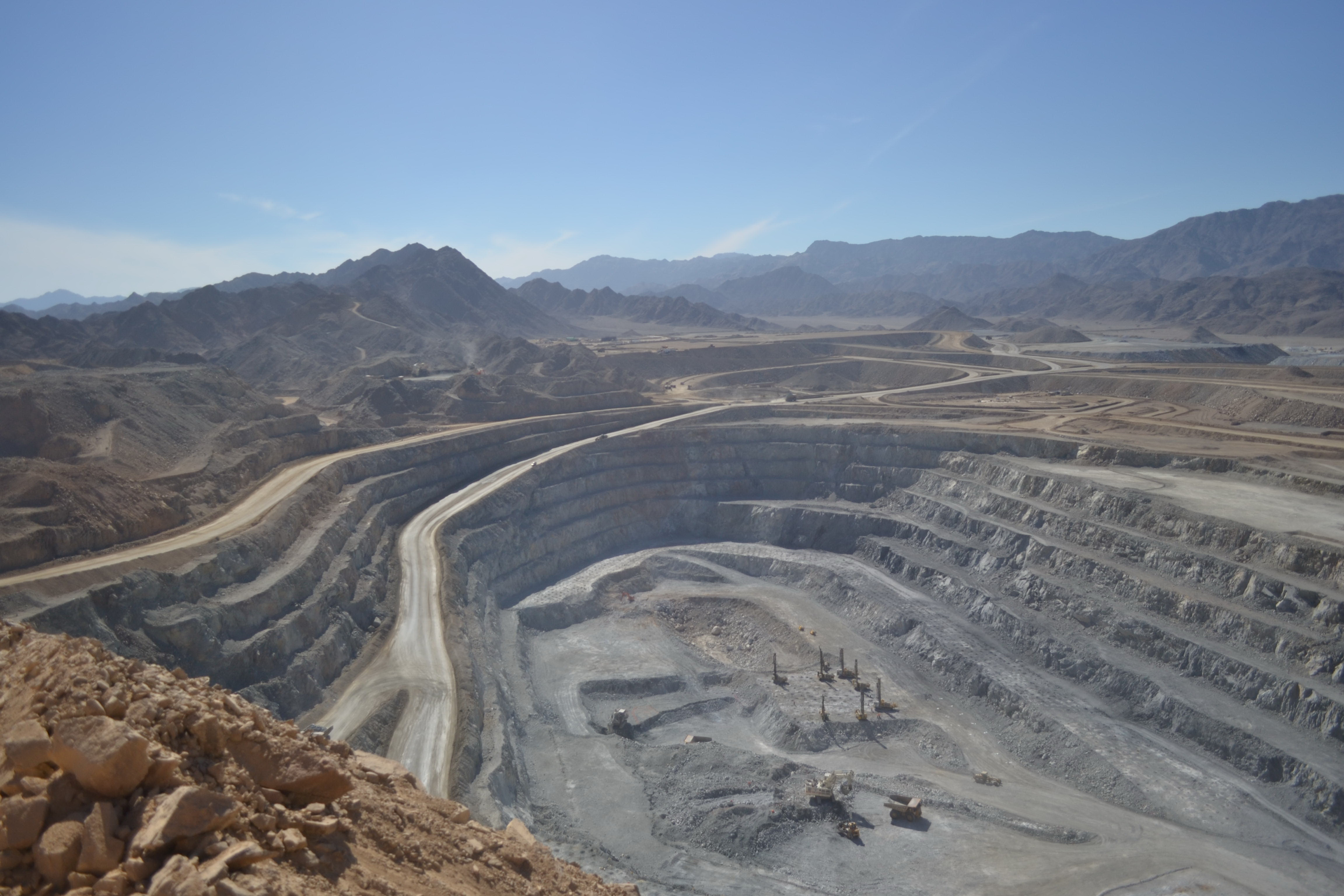
Sukari mine

Alteration zones are considered the most promising areas for mineral exploration in the Central Eastern Desert (CED). Ancient gold miners in Egypt only targeted the smoky quartz veins that contain large amounts of gold; however, they left the alteration areas untouched. Remote sensing and geophysical techniques can provide cost-effective tools that can give valuable information about the new mineralization sites. Mapping of the potential mineralized alteration zones is a critical task to enhance mineral exploration in the CED. Previously, such mapping had utilized standard remote-sensing techniques such as image rationing, principal component analysis, and image classifications. Recent study implemented the Spectral Angle Mapper (SAM) classification, surface structure, aeromagnetic data, and the Multiple Criteria Decision Analysis (MCDA) to aid for better mapping results of the prospective mineralized alterations in CED. For instances, Spectral Angle Mapper (SAM) classification is one of the classification techniques that can be integrated with aeromagnetic data to map the potential gold sites associated within the alteration zone in CED. The United States Geological Survey (USGS) spectral signature data for alteration minerals can be used as an end-member for the SAM classification. To aid in better mapping, the SAM result can be constrained by the structural elements that restrict the mapping to the actual alteration sites. The surface lineation layer from digital remote sensing data and the geophysical information such as total magnetic intensities can be deployed to understand the tectonic regimes in the CED and to detect the structural patterns that control the existence of the gold deposits. For more details please see.

== See more ==
- Economy of Egypt
