= Panchaia =

Panchaia may refer to:

- Panchaia (island), an island mentioned by the philosopher Euhemerus.
- The Panchaia Rupes, a feature on Mars named for the mythical island.
