= Euhemerus =

Ancient Greek philosopher

- Born: Fourth century BC; Messene (now Messina), Sicily
- Died: Third century BC
- Occupations: Writer, philosopher, mythographer, historian

Euhemerus (/juːˈhiːmərəs, -hɛm-/; also spelled Euemeros or Evemerus; Ancient Greek: Εὐήμερος, romanized: Euhēmeros, lit. 'happy' or 'prosperous'; late fourth century BC) was a Greek mythographer at the court of Cassander, the king of Macedon. Euhemerus's birthplace is disputed, with Messina in Sicily as the most probable location, while others suggest Chios or Tegea.

The philosophy attributed to and named for Euhemerus, euhemerism, holds that many mythological tales can be attributed to historical persons and events, the accounts of which have become altered and exaggerated over time.

Euhemerus's work combined elements of fiction and political utopianism. Early Christian writers, such as Lactantius, used Euhemerus's belief that the ancient gods were originally human to confirm their inferiority regarding the Christian God.

== Life ==
Little is known about Euhemerus's life, and his birthplace is disputed. Classical writers, such as Diodorus Siculus, Plutarch, and Polybius, maintained that Euhemerus was a Messenian, but did not specify whether he came from the Peloponnese or the Sicilian Messene, which was an ancient Greek colony. Other ancient testimonies placed his birth at Chios, Tegea (Pseudo-Plutarch in Placita Philosophorum), or Agrigentum (Clement of Alexandria in Protrepticus and Arnobius in Adversus nationes). Most modern scholars, however, generally agree that Euhemerus came from the Sicilian Messene (Messina).

Diodorus Siculus is one of the very few sources that provide other details about Euhemerus's life. According to Diodorus, Euhemerus was a personal friend of Cassander, king of Macedonia (c. 305–297 BC) and the most prominent mythographer for the Macedonian court. Sometime in the early third century BC, Euhemerus wrote his main work, Sacred History (Hiera Anagraphê).

=== Euhemerus' Sacred History ===
Only quoted fragments remain from Euhemerus's main work, Sacred History. Diodorus Siculus included fragments from Euhemerus's writings in the Arabian geography of his fifth book and in the mythology of his sixth book.

The sixth book of Diodorus's Bibliotheca is lost, but Eusebius cites a fragment from it at length in his Praeparatio evangelica. The ancient Roman writer Ennius first translated Euhemerus's work into Latin, but this translation is also lost. Lactantius, however, in the third century AD included substantial references to Ennius's translation in the first book of his Divine Institutes. Various other fragments of importance are also found in the later literature of Augustine of Hippo. From these extant fragments and references, modern scholars have been able to "compile what is presumably a fairly complete picture of Euhemerus' work".

Euhemerus's work may have taken the form of a philosophical, fictionalized travelogue, universally accepted today as a philosophical Romance, incorporating imagined archaic inscriptions that his literary persona claimed to have found during his travels. Euhemerus claims to have traveled to a group of islands in the waters off Arabia. One of these, Panchaea, was home to a utopian society made up of a number of different ethnic tribes. His critique of tradition is epitomized in a register of the births and deaths of many of the deities, which his narrator persona discovered inscribed on a golden pillar in a temple of Zeus Triphylius on the invented island of Panchaea; he claimed to have reached the island on a voyage down the Red Sea round the coast of Arabia, undertaken at the request of Cassander, according to the Christian historian of the fourth century AD Eusebius.

Euhemerus refers to a rational island utopia. The ancient Hellenic tradition of a distant Golden Age, of Hesiod's depiction of human happiness before the gift of Pandora, of the mythic convention of idealized Hyperboreans, made concrete in the legendary figure of the Scythian philosopher-hero Anacharsis, or the idealized "Meropes" of Theopompus had been recently enriched by contacts with India. Euhemerus apparently systematized a method of interpreting the popular myths, which was consistent with the attempts of Hellenistic culture to explain traditional religious beliefs in terms of naturalism. Euhemerus asserted that the Greek gods originally had been kings, heroes, and conquerors, or benefactors to the people, who had thus earned a claim to the veneration of their subjects. According to him, for example, Zeus was a king of Crete who had been a great conqueror; the tomb of Zeus was shown to visitors near Knossos, perhaps engendering or enhancing, among the traditionalists, the reputation of Cretans as liars.

== Euhemerism ==
Euhemerus has become known chiefly for a rationalizing method of interpretation, known as "euhemerism", which treats mythological accounts as a reflection of historical events, or mythological characters as historical personages, but which were shaped, exaggerated, or altered by retelling and traditional mores. In more recent literature of myth, such as in Bulfinch's Mythology, euhemerism is called the "historical interpretation" of mythology. Euhemerism is defined in modern academic literature as the theory that myths are distorted accounts of real historical events. Euhemerus was not the first to attempt to rationalize mythology through history, as euhemeristic views are found in earlier writers, including Xenophanes, Herodotus, Hecataeus of Abdera, and Ephorus, however, Euhemerus is credited as having developed the theory in application to all myths, considering mythology to be "history in disguise".

== See also ==
- Palaephatus
- Prodicus
- Leon of Pella
- List of legendary kings of Britain
- Geomythology
