= Ocolum =

Ocolum or Okolon (Ancient Greek: Ὄκωλον) was a Greek town in ancient Thrace. It is mentioned by Stephanus of Byzantium, who quotes Theopompus and says the town belonged to Eretria. This reference that is usually interpreted as showing that Ocolum was an Eretrian colony in Thrace.

Its site is unlocated.

== See also ==
- Greek colonies in Thrace
