= Ephorus (disambiguation) =

Ephorus or Ephoros may refer to:

- Ephorus of Cyme (c. 400–330 BC), ancient Greek historian
- Ephorus the Younger (fl. 3rd century AD), of Cyme, ancient Greek historian
- Ephorus (teacher), Ephesian painter and teacher of Apelles
- Ephorus, the title of a bishop in the Batak Christian Protestant Church
