= Cratippus =

Cratippus can refer to:

- Cratippus of Athens, a 4th-century BC historian
- Cratippus of Pergamon, a 1st-century BC philosopher
