= Carolyn Dewald =

American classical scholar

- Occupations: Academic; Classicist

Academic background
- Education: University of California, Berkeley
- Thesis: (1975)

Academic work
- Institutions: Stanford; University of Southern California; Bard College; All Souls College, Oxford
- Main interests: Classics; Greek historiography Herodotus; Thucydides

Carolyn Dewald is an American classical scholar who is Professor Emerita of Classical Studies at Bard College. She is an expert on ancient Greek historiography, and the author of several books and articles focusing on the writings of Herodotus and Thucydides.

== Career ==
Carolyn Dewald was educated at Swarthmore College, where she took a BA in 1968. She then read for a PhD in Classics at the University of California, Berkeley, graduating in 1975; her thesis title was 'Taxis: the organization of Thucydides' History, Books ii-viii'. She taught at Stanford (1975-1977) and the University of Southern California (1977-2003), where she also spent a period as departmental chair of classics. During this time she also spent a period at Vassar College as Blegen Visiting Distinguished Professor (2001-2002). She then became Professor of History and Classics at Bard College, where she directed the Classical Studies programme. In Michaelmas term of 2013 she was a visiting fellow at All Souls College, Oxford, where she worked alongside Rosaria Munson on writing a commentary of Herodotus Book I.

== Selected publications ==
- 1998 (ed., with translation by Robin Waterfield). Herodotus: The Histories. Oxford University Press. ISBN 9780199535668.
- 2005. Thucydides' War Narrative: A Structural Study. University of California Press. ISBN 9786612357473
- 2006 (ed., with John Marincola). The Cambridge Companion to Herodotus. Cambridge University Press. ISBN 9780521830010
- 2012. 'Myth and legend in Herodotus' first book'. In Emily Baragwanath and Mathieu de Bakker (eds.), Myth, Truth and Narrative in Herodotus. Oxford University Press. ISBN 9780199693979. pp. 59–85.
