= Acadine =

Ancient volcanic spring in Sicily sacred to the Palici

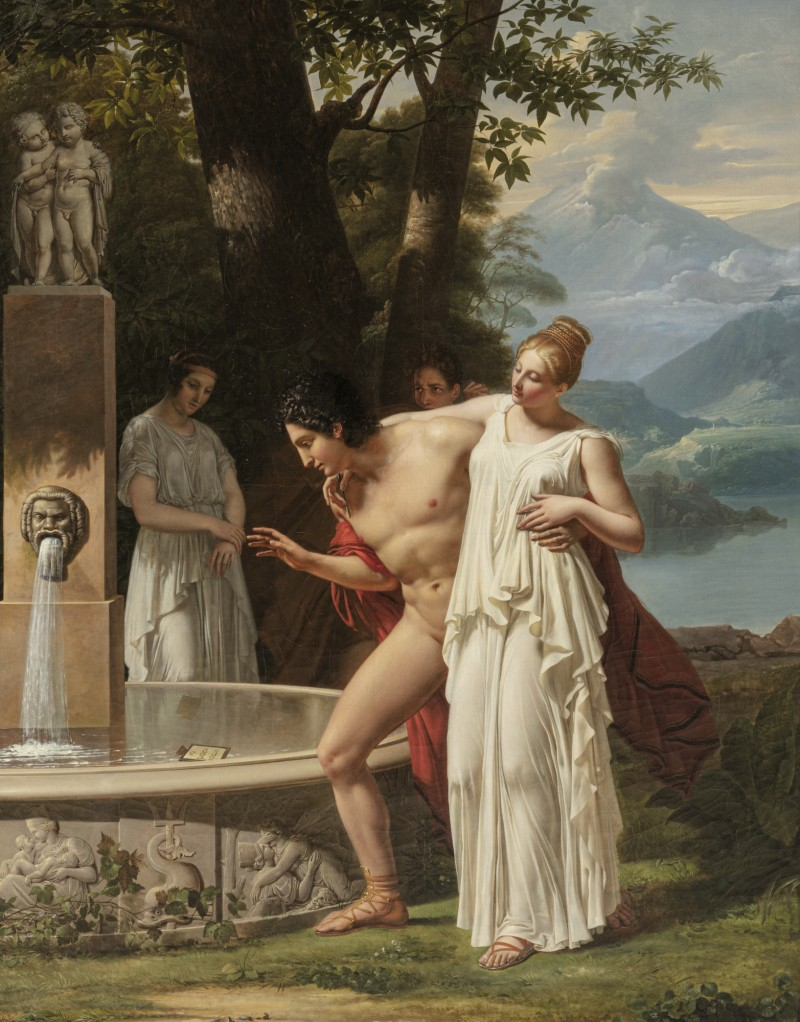
Charles-Victoire-Frédéric Moench's Painting (1814) The Acadine Fountian

The Greek historian Diodorus Siculus described in Book 11.89 of his Bibliotheca historica a pool that spouted hot, sulfurous water at the sanctuary of the Palici in Sicily, and said solemn oaths were undertaken there. According to the Aristotelian On Marvellous Things Heard, a sworn statement would be written on a tablet and thrown into the pool. If true it floated, but otherwise it sank to the bottom and the perjuror would be scalded. The Bibliotheca Historica mentions that the pool was a place that escaped slaves would take sanctuary. Renaissance and later authors took up this story, calling it the Acadine fountain, though this name is not attested in ancient sources.

== Artistic Depiction ==
Charles-Victoire-Frédéric Moench's 1814 painting The Acadine Fountain illustrates the myth of Acadine. The oil on canvas measures 131.5 × 102.6 cm (51 3/4 × 40 3/8 in.) and was auctioned at Sotheby's Paris on June 30, 2020, with a final price of €77,825, surpassing its estimated value of €30,000–50,000.
