= Aton Resources =

Canadian exploration company

Aton Resources Inc. (TSX.V: AAN) is a Canadian listed exploration company principally focused on advancing the Rodruin and Hamama mineral exploration projects in the Eastern Desert of Egypt (located within the Arabian-Nubian Shield). It has offices in Vancouver, Canada, and Cairo, Egypt. Tonno Vahk took over as interim president and chief executive officer in October 2021. It is listed on the TSX Venture Exchange under the ticker TSXV:AAN.

== Operations ==
The company holds mineral concessions at Abu Marawat. The Abu Marawat Concession was previously controlled by Centamin and was subsequently awarded to Alexander Nubia as part of the international bid round. The concessions are located in close proximity to excellent infrastructure (near to railway, seaport, high tension electricity grid and the major cities of Qena and Safaga).

Within the Abu Marawat Concession are several different deposits representing different geological environments:

1. Abu Marawat: a mesothermal gold-copper vein deposit
2. Hamama: a volcanogenic massive sulfide ore deposit
3. South Miranda: a copper-gold porphyry deposit
4. Semna: a sheeted gold-bearing quartz vein structure in granodiorite deposit
5. Sir Bakis, Massaghat, Zeno and Bohlog: a gold-rich quartz vein deposit

The company is currently focusing on two principal deposits at Rodruin and Hamama.
