= Callon of Epidaurus =

2nd-century BC Greek transgender man

Callon (born Callo; fl. 2nd century BC) was an intersex person, whose medical treatment is the first recorded example of gender affirmation surgery. His life is known from the works of Diodorus Siculus.

== Biography ==
Callon was born in Epidaurus in Greece, during the second half of the second century BC. The details known about Callon's life appear in the Bibliotheca Historica written by Diodorus Siculus. Assigned female at birth, he is described by Diodorus Siculus as an orphan, who was forced to marry when he "came of age" and lived with his husband for two years. Laura Pfunter interprets Callon's age before marriage as 'pre-pubescent'. Diodorus Siculus reported he had heard that Callon was a priestess prior to his marriage.

Although little is known about Callon's married life, Diodorus Siculus recorded that Callon was "not capable of natural Embraces as a Woman" and was forced "to endure those [embraces] that were preternatural, or besides nature". It is recorded that during the marriage, a tumour in Callon's groin became prominent and painful, but no doctors would treat it. However, eventually an apothecary offered to treat him and incised the tumour; from the tumour "a man's privates were protruded, namely testicles and an imperforate penis". The apothecary then proceeded to open the glans and make a passage for the urethra, using a silver catheter to drain the wound and then stitched the wound together. The apothecary charged twice the amount for his services since "he had received a female invalid and made her into a healthy young man".

After his recovery, Callon changed his birthname of Callo to Callon and began to live as a man. Symbolically he cast aside his weaving equipment, which was strongly associated with women's work. After his transition, Callon was brought to trial since he had witnessed religious rituals which were exclusive to women, before he had transitioned.

== Historiography ==
In 2015 it was suggested that Callon's condition was most likely the intersex variant diagnosed nowadays as 46XY DSD. The surgery he underwent is the first recorded procedure of its type and differs little from modern techniques. Rebecca Langlands notes the medical significance in how Callon's transition is reported. For Luc Brisson the androgyny of Callon, and also Diophantus of Abae, is a natural phenomenon that can be solved by surgical intervention. Shaun Tougher observes that both Callon and Diophantus' lives are found "in the context of the Hellenistic east". Katharine T. von Stackelberg wrote that "hermaphrodism" was common enough to warrant its own laws.

== See also ==
- Diophantus of Abae
