= William Abbott Oldfather =

American classical philologist (1880–1945)

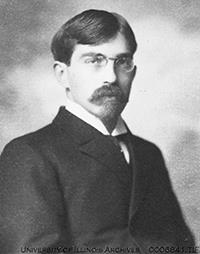
- William Abbott Oldfather, c. 1906. Courtesy of the University of Illinois Archives.
- Born: October 23, 1880; Urumiah, Persia
- Died: May 27, 1945 (aged 64); Homer, Illinois, U.S.
- Occupation: Academic
- Spouse: Margaret Agnes Giboney (m. 1902)
- Children: 2
- Relatives: Charles Henry Oldfather (brother)

Academic background
- Education: A.B. Hanover College, 1899; LL.D., 1933; A.B. Harvard University, 1901; A.M., 1902; Ph.D. Ludwig-Maximilians-Universität München (LMU), 1908
- Thesis: "Lokrika: sagengeschichtliche Untersuchungen" (1908)

Academic work
- Discipline: Classics scholar
- Sub-discipline: History of Locris

William Abbott Oldfather (23 October 1880 – 27 May 1945) was an American classical scholar. He was influential in building strong academic traditions in classical studies at the University of Illinois and for his studies of ancient Locris in Greece.

== Early life and education ==
William Oldfather was born in 1880 to American parents stationed in Urumiah, Persia (now Reza'iyeh, Iran or Urmia, Iran). His parents were Presbyterian missionaries, Jeremiah Oldfather and Felicia (née Rice). His father's paternal immigrant ancestor had emigrated from Germany in 1770 before the American Revolution and his mother's ancestors included pioneer explorer Daniel Boone. His younger brother was Charles Henry Oldfather (1887–1954), who also became a classical scholar. He was noted for many translations, and they sometimes worked together.

In 1890 the family returned to the United States, working in Harmony, Indiana. Oldfather attended local schools and did his college work at Hanover College, with a second bachelor's degree completed at Harvard College, followed by a master's degree.

He married Margaret Agnes Giboney in 1902; they had two daughters. He started his academic career teaching Classics at Northwestern University, and studying deeply in important German scholarship. In 1906, he traveled to Germany for additional graduate work; he was awarded a doctorate by the Ludwig-Maximilians-Universität München in 1908. He studied with Hellenist Otto Crusius, the Latinist Friedrich Vollmer, historian Robert von Pöhlmann; and archeologist and art historian Adolf Furtwängler. Oldfather was strongly influenced by his studies in Germany: he became a great admirer of German scholarship, nearly bilingual in the language, and sympathetic to the Socialist cause.

== Academic career ==
Returning to the United States, Oldfather worked for a year at Northwestern before moving to the faculty of the University of Illinois in 1909. In 1910, he and Arthur Stanley Pease worked together to create what is now the Classics Library Collection. Becoming a full professor in 1915, he served as "Czar of Classics" and made numerous contributions. He was head of his department from 1926 to his death in 1945, supervising the dissertations of dozens of PhD students, including the classicist Richmond Lattimore.

During World War I there was extensive anti-German sentiment. Oldfather and several colleagues in 1917 were accused by Federal agents of "pro-German sympathies and disloyalty to the United States." Insisting on a public meeting at the university, Oldfather and his colleagues were exonerated but most of them did not have positions equivalent to his and were dismissed, part of widespread discrimination against German-associated persons during the war. After the war, Oldfather worked to re-establish connections with German scholars and support major projects in classical studies.

From 1915 Oldfather also served as chief editor of a monograph series, Illinois Studies in Languages and Literature, and, from 1931, as curator of the classical museum. He made his major academic contributions on the history of Locris in Ancient Greece, which he studied throughout his life. Oldfather observed that German scholarship in the classics interrogated the past on significant issues related to the problems of politics and economics that recur in modern life. He believed they had a more substantive approach than some English and American scholarship of the period.

He supported the Republicans in the Spanish Civil War, warned against fascists in Germany and Italy and, during World War II, warned of a coming competition with the Soviet Union. He died before the end of the war.

In 1909, Oldfather had founded the University of Illinois' Walking Club. He met his death during one of the club's outings. Late one Sunday afternoon in May 1945 he attempted to shoot his canoe over a knee-high dam in the Salt Fork River near Homer, Illinois. An expert canoeist, he had done this many times at this spot, but this time, the canoe capsized. Attempting to retrieve his gear, Oldfather was drawn under the dam by a powerful back current, and he drowned. His body was found nine hours later.

== Works ==
- Ysopet-Avionnet: The Latin and French Texts (1919) with Kenneth McKenzie
- Discourses of Epictetus (1925), Loeb Classical Library Vol. 131, translator
- Contributions Toward a Bibliography of Epictetus (1927)
- Index Apuleianus (1934)
- Index verborum Ciceronis Epistularum (1938) with H. V. Canter and K. M. Abbott
- Studies in the text tradition of St. Jerome's Vitae patrum (1943), editor
