= Papyrus Oxyrhynchus 842 =

Ancient Greek manuscript

Papyrus Oxyrhynchus 842 (P. Oxy. V 842 | LDAB 583) is a papyrus manuscript, written in Ancient Greek, discovered during the 1906 excavations in Oxyrhynchus in modern Egypt by Bernard Pyne Grenfell and Arthur Surridge Hunt. It contains a history of classic Greece for the years 396-395 BCE. Along with PSI XII 1304, it makes up the Hellenica Oxyrhynchia.

== Background and description ==
Originally consisting of around 230 fragments of various sizes, Grenfell and Hunt were able to piece together all but 53 of them. They produced a transcription of the pieced together fragments, along with two plates and a translation in The Oxyrhynchus Papyri, Part 5 in 1908. The manuscript itself is written on the verso (reverse) of a papyrus roll that was originally used as an official land-survey register. Though starting off very fragmentary, the final result evidences around 21 columns of text.

The average dimensions of each column is 16.7 cm height by 9 cm width, with the roll height at 21.2 cm.

The script type of the manuscript is an example of the severe style or strenger stil. This is characterised by a sloping, pointed handwriting with alternating thick and thin horizontal and vertical strokes.

According to Grenfell & Hunt, at least two hands were responsible for the manuscript, with the first hand writing most of the manuscript, from Column 1-4, then Column 6 line 27-Column 21. Hand two therefore wrote column 5 to column 6 line 26. Hand one wrote in "a small neat uncial of the sloping oval type... at the end of a line is generally indicated by a horizontal stroke above the final letter... A peculiar characteristic of this scribe is his tendency (especially at the ends of lines) to combine the letters and or and so that the last vertical stroke of the first letter serves also as the first of the second... Diaereses are sometimes placed over ι and υ." Hand two is characterised as writing "smaller and rougher than the first [hand]. At the end of a line is often written as a horizontal stroke; and a diaeresis occurs in v. 44. Stops (high points) are freely employed, a slight space being also left to mark the pause, and sometimes the space occurs where the stop is omitted... A paragraphus is found in vi. 10 marking a transition which the first hand would have ignored... Unlike the first scribe, the second hand writes ι adscript."

== Dating ==
Based on the land register on the recto (front) mentioning the 4th and 12th year of an unnamed Emperor, Grenfell & Hunt state that "since the survey was probably written soon after the 12th year, the reign of Commodus, which in Egypt was reckoned from his father's accession and therefore begins with his 20th year, is out of the question; the reign of Hadrian or Antoninus is as likely to be meant as that of Marcus Aurelius[,]" and therefore "the survey on the recto was, as we have said, written about the middle of the second century, and we should ascribe the text on the verso to the end of that century or the early part of the third." Accordingly, the Leuven Database of Ancient Books gives the manuscript a date range of 150-224 CE.
