= Charles Henry Oldfather =

American historian (1887–1954)

Charles Henry Oldfather (13 June 1887 – 20 August 1954) was an American professor of Greek and Ancient History at the University of Nebraska-Lincoln. He was born in Tabriz, Persia.

== Parentage ==
Oldfather's parents, Jeremiah and Felicia, were missionaries in Persia for 19 years. They immigrated to the United States when Charles was aged two years. His father was born in Farmsberg, Ohio in 1842 and his mother was from Covington, Indiana.

== Life ==
Oldfather received a bachelor's degree from Hanover College, Indiana. After three years in a seminary, Oldfather went to the Ludwig-Maximilians-Universität München for two years and then became an instructor at the Syrian Protestant College where he taught until 1914. In 1914, Oldfather married Margaret Kinsey McLelland, the niece of journalist David Graham Phillips. They had three children.

Oldfather was then appointed Professor of Classics at Hanover College where he taught for two years before moving to Wabash College, Indiana in 1916 to teach Greek and Ancient History for 10 years. While he was at Wabash College, Oldfather was awarded a PhD from the University of Wisconsin. In 1926, Oldfather was appointed Professor of Ancient History at the University of Nebraska. He was appointed Chair of the History Department in 1929. In 1932, Oldfather became Dean of the College of Arts and Sciences. He remained at the University of Nebraska until he retired in 1951. He died in 1954 from a heart ailment.

== Original works and translations ==
- The first six volumes of Diodorus of Sicily, Library of History, later comprising twelve volumes, with the English translation undertaken by Oldfather, London, Heinemann, 1933-1954
- The Greek literary texts from Greco-Roman Egypt (1923)
- De jure naturae et gentium libri octo (1934)

== See also ==
- William Abbott Oldfather
