= Leon of Pella =

Ancient Egyptian historian and theologian

Leon of Pella (Greek: Λέων ὁ Πελλαῖος) or Leo the Egyptian (4th century BC) was a historian, priest and theologian. He wrote the book On the Gods in Egypt (Περὶ τῶν κατ' Αἴγυπτον Θεῶν), based on an apocryphal letter of Alexander the Great to his mother Olympias. He was a contemporary of Euhemerus and explained similarly the human origin of the gods.

The early Christian writers, in their controversy with the heathens, refer not infrequently to a Leo or Leon as "having admitted that the deities of the ancient gentile world had been originally men, agreeing in this respect with Euhemerus, with whom he was contemporary, or perhaps rather earlier.

Augustine, who is most explicit in his notice of him, says he was an Egyptian priest of high rank, "magnus antistes", and expounded the popular mythology to Alexander the Great, in a manner which, though differing from those, rationalistic explanations received in Greece, accorded with them in making the gods (including even the dii majorum gentium) to have been originally men.

Augustine refers to an account of the statements of Leo contained in a letter of Alexander to his mother. It is to be observed, that although Leon was high in his priestly rank at the time when Alexander was in Egypt (b. c. 332–331), his name is Greek; and Arnobius (Adv. Gentes, iv. 29) calls him Leo Pellaeus, Leo of Pella, an epithet which Fabricius does not satisfactorily explain. Euhemerus was also at the court of Cassander, the king of Macedon.
