= Philinus of Agrigentum =

Ancient Greek historian

Philinus of Agrigentum (3rd-century BCE), Magna Graecia, was a historian who lived during the First Punic War, who is said to have written history from a pro-Carthaginian standpoint. His writings were used as a source by Polybius and Diodorus for their descriptions of the First Punic War. Although Polybius uses Philinus' writings, he also accuses him of being biased and inconsistent. Philinus maintained that the initial Roman intervention in Sicily at the start of the First Punic War violated a treaty between Rome and Carthage from 306 B.C.E. which recognized Roman sovereignty on the Italian peninsula and Carthaginian control in Sicily. Polybius was unable to find this treaty in the treasury of the aediles in the Temple of Jupiter Optimus Maximus alongside other treaties between Rome and Carthage, and claimed that it could not have existed. However, evidence from Servius suggests that there may have been a real treaty, thereby potentially exonerating Philinus' account. There is, as yet, little scholarly consensus about this treaty nor has Philinus' account been thoroughly proven or disproven.
