= Panchaia (island) =

Fictional island

Panchaia (also Panchaea /ˌpæŋˈkeɪə/ Greek: Παγχαία) is an island mentioned in the literature of classical antiquity; its location has never been determined.

The earliest surviving mention of Panchaia occurs in the work of the ancient Greek philosopher Euhemerus, who wrote in the late-4th century BC. Euhemerus describes this place as home to a utopian society made up of several different ethnic tribes which had a collective economy. He described his trip there in his major work Sacred History, only fragments of which survive. The later Greek historian Diodorus Siculus (fl. 1st century BC) and the 4th-century AD Christian writer Eusebius of Caesarea preserved fragments of Euhemerus' writings. The surviving fragments describe Panchaia as a rational island paradise located in the Indian Ocean. Euhemerus went there by traveling through the Red Sea and around the Arabian Peninsula. In Panchaia's temple of Zeus Triphylius, he found a register of the births and deaths of the gods, proving they were merely historical figures.

Lygdamus, one of the Tibullan elegists, mentions Panchaia (Tib. 3.2.23), as a rich place from which he will hope for gifts to his grave.

Virgil (70 to 19 BC) described Panchaia as "incense bearing, rich with sands" (Latin: totaque turiferis Panchaia pinguis harenis, Georgics 2.139).

Possible locations of the island include Socotra and Bahrain.

Diodorus writes that the inhabitants of Panchaia are autochthonous and are called Panchaeans, the other inhabitants being Indians, Scythians, and Cretans, alongside a group called "Oceanites". The island included a city called Panara. It possessed many elephants, lions, leopards, gazelles, and other wild animals.

== Bibliography ==
- Brown, Truesdell S. (1946). "Euhemerus and the Historians". Harvard Theological Review. 39 (4): 259–274. doi:10.1017/S0017816000023245.
- Pinheiro, Marilia P. Futre (2006). "Utopia and Utopias: a Study on a Literary Genre in Antiquity" (PDF). Authors, Authority and Interpreters in the Ancient Novel. Groningen: Barkhuis. pp. 147–171. ISBN 907792213X.
- Winiarczyk, Marek (2013). "The sources of the socio-economic description". The "Sacred History" of Euhemerus of Messene. Berlin/Boston: De Gruyter. p. 85. ISBN 978-3-11-027888-0.
