= Ctesicles =

Ctesicles (Ancient Greek: Κτησικλῆς) was the author of a chronological work (Chronika or Chronoi), of which two fragments are preserved in Athenaeus.

Ctesicles was also a sculptor, who made a statue at Samos and an Athenian general
