= Centamin =

Gold mining company

Centamin plc
- Company type: Subsidiary acquired by AngloGold Ashanti plc on 22 November 2024
- Traded as: Delisted from the LSE: CEY and TSX: CEE on 22 November 2024
- Industry: Gold mining
- Founded: 1970; 56 years ago
- Products: Gold
- Revenue: ▲US$891.3 million (2023)
- Operating income: ▲US$194.5 million (2023)
- Net income: ▲US$194.9 million (2023)
- Website: www.anglogoldashanti.com

Centamin is a gold mining and exploration company, whose main operating asset is the Sukari gold mine in Egypt. Centamin is wholly owned by AngloGold Ashanti plc.

== History ==
Centamin was first listed on the then Australian Stock Exchange in 1970. In 1999, it acquired Pharaoh Gold Mines, a company that had been exploring for gold in Egypt since 1995, and became "Centamin Egypt". The company was granted a 160 square kilometre exploitation lease over the Sukari Gold Project in the eastern desert of Egypt in 2005. A listing was secured on the Toronto Stock Exchange in 2007 to raise funding for production, with first gold poured in June 2009. The Company moved to a full listing on the London Stock Exchange in November 2009, and was delisted from the Australian Stock Exchange in 2010. In 2011, it redomiciled to Jersey and changed its name to Centamin plc.

In November 2024, Centamin plc was acquired by AngloGold Ashanti plc and now forms part of AngloGold Ashanti’s diverse portfolio of global operations.

== Operations ==
The company operates the Sukari Gold Mine in the Eastern Desert of Egypt, some 700 km from Cairo and 25 km from the Red Sea. First gold was poured at Sukari in June 2009 and commercial production began on 1 April 2010, making Sukari the first modern gold mine in Egypt, a country which in ancient times was a prolific producer of the precious metal.
