= Hellenica Oxyrhynchia =

Ancient Greek historical account

Hellenica Oxyrhynchia is an Ancient Greek history of Greece in the late 5th and early 4th centuries BCE known only from papyrus fragments unearthed at Oxyrhynchus in Egypt. The author, whose name is not recorded in the surviving fragments, is usually known by scholars simply as the "Oxyrhynchus historian".

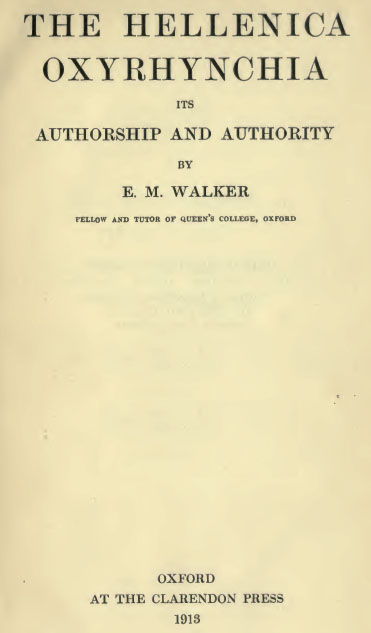
Title Page of the Book

== Overview ==
One of the two major fragments, called the London papyrus, found in 1906, deals with battles in the late Peloponnesian War, particularly the Battle of Notium. The other, the Florentine papyrus, found in 1934, deals with events in the early 4th century BCE. The entire history seems to have been a continuation of Thucydides covering events from 411 BCE to 394 BCE, much like Xenophon's Hellenica (a fragment of which has also been found at Oxyrhynchus).

The discovery of the first papyrus in 1906 led to a shift in the degree of credence that historians assigned to the ancient sources of the period. In the 19th century, Xenophon, a contemporary of the events he described, was presumed to be universally preferable to the much later Diodorus Siculus. The papyrus was found to agree more with Diodorus's account than with Xenophon's on several key issues. This led to a re-evaluation of the values of these sources, and modern historians now prefer Diodorus' account at a number of points.

== Author ==
While the historian's identity has been extensively debated by modern scholars, a consensus has not been achieved. Among the authors suggested at early stages have been prominent historians such as Ephorus and Theopompus, although most of these have been strongly objected to on grounds of style, presentation, or subject matter. The most likely candidate seems to be Cratippus, an Athenian historian of the 4th century BCE. The style, biases, and coverage (Cratippus's work is known to have been a continuation of Thucydides) support the identification, although issues have been raised. Bruno Bleckmann, an expert on ancient historiography, has pleaded again for Theopompus as the author of the Hellenica.

The work is praised for its pragmatism and style, but it is not without its detractors. The writing, in the words of the classicist H. D. Westlake, is that of a "competent and most conscientious historian who derives his material from the best possible sources, [and] makes an effort to interpret it impartially, but somehow lacks distinction in thought and style. He is a second-rate Thucydides."
