= Hellenic historiography =

Science of Greek historical writing

Hellenic, Greek, or ancient Greek historiography involves efforts made by the Ancient Greeks to track and record historical events. By the 5th century BC, it became an integral part of ancient Greek literature and held a prestigious place in later Roman historiography and Byzantine literature.

== Overview ==
The historical period of ancient Greece is exclusive in world history as the first period attested directly in proper historiography, while earlier ancient history or proto-history is known by much more circumstantial evidence, such as annals, chronicles, king lists, and pragmatic epigraphy.

The ancient Greeks told myths and legends about their past, such as the legends associated with the Trojan War. In the 6th century BC, skeptical authors cast doubt on the irrational aspects of these stories while maintaining their basic core. According to Moses Finley, the first steps towards history writing by Greeks were taken in Ionia, where Greeks were in closest contact with foreign peoples and later came under the rule of non-Greek polities: Lydia and Persia. Wishing to learn something about their rulers, Greek writers began to collect information on the geography, customs, and pieces of history of the Lydians and Persians. Only disparate quotations of these works survive.

Hecataeus of Miletus has been described as the author who "foreshadows Herodotus". In his Genealogies, he examined legendary tales, behind which he saw "historical facts distorted by exaggeration or by literal interpretation of metaphors." He also wrote a work of geography, the Periēgēsis or Periodos gēs (Journey round the World), which contains information about the countries and peoples located along the coasts of the Mediterranean and Black Sea.

Herodotus is widely known as the "father of history", his Histories being eponymous of the entire field. Written between the 450s and 420s BC, the scope of Herodotus' work reaches about a century in the past, discussing 6th century BC historical figures such as Darius I of Persia, Cambyses II, and Psamtik III and alludes to some 8th century BC ones such as Candaules.

Herodotus was succeeded by authors such as Thucydides and Xenophon. Most of these authors were either Athenians or pro-Athenians, which explains why far more is known about the history and politics of Athens than of most other contemporary cities. Their scope is further limited by a focus on political, military and diplomatic history, generally ignoring economic and social history. However, while works approaching modern ethnography arose primarily amongst the Romans, some Greeks did include ancillary material describing the customs and rituals of different peoples, Herodotus himself being a prime example in his descriptions of the Egyptians, Scythians, and others.

The tradition of ancient Greek historiography proved to be very influential over the centuries. Polybius, who witnessed the Greeks coming under Roman hegemony, is considered the most important historiographer of the Hellenistic period. The first Roman historians still wrote in Greek, and Latin historiography was also strongly influenced by Greek traditions: Authors such as Sallust and Tacitus were heavily influenced by Thucydides. Greek historiography continued to flourish in late antiquity, reaching a final peak with Procopius of Caesarea. Theophylact Simocatta, who wrote in the early 7th century AD, is generally considered to be the last ancient Greek historiographer.

== See also ==
- List of ancient Greek historians
- List of Graeco-Roman geographers
- Chinese historiography
- Roman historiography
