= Diophantus of Abae =

2nd-century BC Macedonian Greek soldier

Diophantus (Ancient Greek: Διόφαντος), born Herais (Ancient Greek: Ἡραΐς; fl. 2nd century BC), was an hermaphrodite who lived in the second century BC and fought as a soldier with Alexander Balas. His life is known from the works of Diodorus Siculus.

== Biography ==
Diophantus was born in the city of Abae, in Arabia, during the reign of Alexander Balas. Mistakenly thought to be born a female, his birthname was Herais. His father, who was also called Diophantus, was a Macedonian Greek, and he married an Arab woman from the region. The couple's first child, a baby boy also called Diophantus, died at a young age. Diophantus Senior was perhaps a military settler in the region along with many other Macedonians.

Diophantus was married to a man named Samias, who travelled abroad after they had been married for one year. Diophantus then fell ill with a fever and a tumour formed at the base of his abdomen. Doctors suspected this was a tumour in the womb. The doctors tried to apply medication, but on the seventh day of the disease, the tumour ruptured, and male genitalia appeared. Diophantus' mother and two servants witnessed this occurrence. The women dressed Diophantus in the typical feminine way, imagining that Diophantus had had homosexual relations with his husband.

When Samias returned from his travels, Diophantus no longer wanted to be married. Samias took Diophantus' father to court and the judges decided that the wife should return to the husband. Diophantus then removed his clothes, revealing himself as a man, protesting that the judges had forced one man to live with another. Diophantus began to wear male clothes, and doctors concluded that his internal sexual characteristics had been hidden inside an egg-shaped compartment, through which there was a membrane through which excreta flowed. Doctors performed cosmetic surgery, giving his genitalia a "decent shape". It was after this operation that he took the name Diophantus.

Diophantus then enlisted in the cavalry and fought in the forces of Alexander Balas. It is likely that he belonged to the Guard due to the "permanent character of [his] military service in the cavalry during peacetime". If his father was a military settler, his service would imply an inherited military service.

Samias, who was still in love with him, and yet was ashamed that their marriage was defined as "unnatural", appointed Diophantus as his heir and killed himself.

Diophantus' life also links to a prophecy that predicted Alexander Balas' death would come at the birthplace of the "two-formed" – meaning Abae, where Diophantus was born.

== Historiography ==
The life of Diophantus is known only from the Bibliotheca Historica of Diodorus Siculus, which was written in the century after Diophantus' death. Rebecca Langlands notes that Diophantus' life is "presented as true, if hard to believe, like many paradoxica".

Diophantus is not the only intersex person to be recognised in the ancient world, and Helen King compares his transition in particular to that of Phaethousa. Jay Kyle Petersen compares his life to that of Callon of Epidaurus, who lived thirty years later and whose life is also described by Diodorus Siculus.

According to Luc Brisson, Diophantus' life is one example of several tropes of hermaphroditism in antiquity: "'mixed marriages' producing dual-sexed offspring"; the disruption of family relations; confusion of gendered tasks. For Shaun Tougher one of the important aspects of the timing of Diophantus' change is that it occurred after marriage. Julia Doroszewska points out that his transition did not stop Diophantus from being active in society, and in fact could be read as a means of social advancement. Doroszewska also interprets Diophantus' life as an example of a trope where a girl transforms to a hyper-masculine man.

According to Stefanie van der Gracht, Diophantus' medical condition could be interpreted as pseudohermaphroditism, which can become apparent after the onset of puberty. Van der Gracht suggests that the young Diophantus may have been married before the onset of puberty.
