= Duris of Samos =

4th-century BC Greek historian and tyrant of Samos

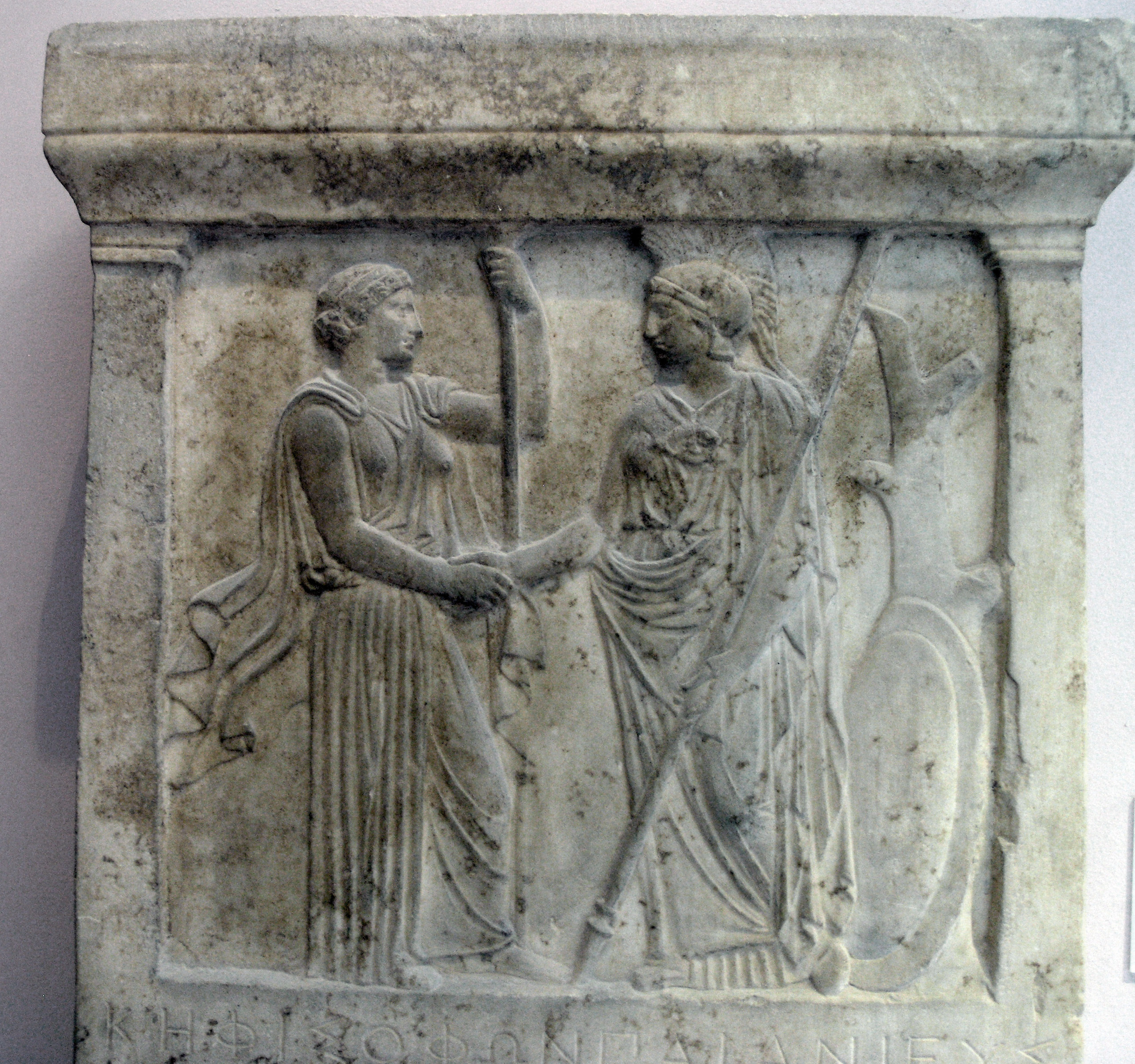
- Relief inscribed stele with the Samian honorary decree
- Born: c. 350 BC
- Died: After 281 BC; Samos
- Occupations: Tyrant; Historian
- Known for: Ruling Samos; Writing history
- Notable work: A narrative history of Greece

Duris of Samos (or Douris) (Ancient Greek: Δοῦρις ὁ Σάμιος; c. 350 BC – after 281 BC) was a Greek historian and was at some period tyrant of Samos. Duris was the author of a narrative history of events in Greece and especially Macedonia from 371 BC to 281 BC, which has been lost. Other works included a life of Agathocles of Syracuse and a number of treatises on literary and artistic subjects.

== Personal and political life ==
Duris claimed to be a descendant of Alcibiades. He had a son, Scaeus, who won the boys' boxing at the Olympian Games "while the Samians were in exile"; that is, before 324 BC. From 352 to 324 Samos was occupied by Athenian cleruchs who had expelled the native Samians. Duris therefore may well have been born at some date close to 350 BC, and, since his main historical work ended with the death of Lysimachus in 281 BC, must have died at an unknown date after that. Some modern sources assume that the Olympic victor Scaeus must have been the father, not the son, of the historian Duris; hence he is described in at least two encyclopedias as "son of Scaeus". The ancient sources, admittedly meagre, do not support this. Duris was the brother of Lynceus of Samos, author of comedies, letters and the essay Shopping for Food.

Many 20th century works state that Duris was a pupil of Theophrastus at Athens. There is no evidence for this claim other than a conjectural emendation by Adamantios Korais of the text of the Deipnosophistae of Athenaeus. The emendation was published by J. Schweighäuser in 1802 and has been accepted by all subsequent editors of Athenaeus. The manuscript text says not that Duris studied under Theophrastus, but that his brother Lynceus and Lynceus's correspondent Hippolochus did so.

The only recorded fact about Duris's public life is that he was tyrant, or sole ruler, of Samos. How he attained this position, for how long he held it, and what events took place under his rule, are unknown. "His reign was uneventful", Hazel guesses.

== Writings ==
Duris was the author of a narrative history of events in Greece and Macedonia from the battle of Leuctra (371 BC) down to the death of Lysimachus (281 BC). This work, like all his others, is lost; over thirty fragments are known through quotations by other authors, including Plutarch. It was continued in the Histories of Phylarchus. Other works by Duris included a life of Agathocles of Syracuse, which was a source for books 19-21 of the Historical Library of Diodorus Siculus. Duris also wrote historical annals of Samos arranged according to the lists of the priests of Hera; and a number of treatises on literary and artistic subjects.

=== List of works ===
Parts of eight of Duris's works survive, ranging from 33 fragments of his Histories to a single, small fragment from his On Sculpture. A full listing is:

- Histories (also listed as Macedonica and Hellenica; 33 fragments)
- On Agathocles (also listed as Libyca; 13 fragments)
- Annals of Samos (22 fragments)
- On Laws (2 fragments)
- On Games (4 fragments)
- On Tragedy (and perhaps On Euripides and Sophocles; 2 fragments)
- On Painters (2 fragments)
- On Sculpture (1 fragment)

=== Later opinions ===
Of those later authors who knew Duris's work, few praise it. Cicero accords him qualified praise as an industrious writer. Plutarch used his work but repeatedly expresses doubt as to his trustworthiness. Dionysius of Halicarnassus speaks disparagingly of his style. Photius regards the arrangement of his work as altogether faulty. By contrast with recent predecessors such as Ephorus, Duris served as the exemplar of a new fashion for "tragic history" which gave entertainment and excitement greater importance than factual reporting. In Plutarch's "Life of Pericles" a telling example is Duris's elaborate (and, according to Plutarch, exaggerated) description of cruelty and extensive destruction at Samos when Athenian forces, led by Pericles, subdued the island.

Recent critics, believing that Duris was a pupil of Theophrastus, have attempted either to demonstrate that "tragic history" agreed with the teachings of the Peripatetic school or to analyse Duris's motives for taking a different line from his supposed teachers. The debate was inevitably inconclusive.

== Bibliography ==
=== Editions of the fragments ===
- C. Müller, Fragmenta historicorum Graecorum vol. 2 (Paris, 1848) pp. 466–488. [Greek with Latin translation and commentary]
- F. Jacoby, Die Fragmente der griechischen Historiker vol. 2A pp. 1136–1158 [Greek text]; vol. 2C pp. 115–131 [German commentary]

=== Modern scholarship ===
- J. P. Barron, "The Tyranny of Duris of Samos" in Classical Review new series vol. 12 (1962) pp. 189–192.
- C. O. Brink, "Tragic History and Aristotle's School" in Proceedings of the Cambridge Philological Society vol. 186 (1960) pp. 14–19.
- A. Dalby, "The Curriculum Vitae of Duris of Samos" in Classical quarterly new series vol. 41 (1991) pp. 539–541.
- R. B. Kebric, In the Shadow of Macedon: Duris of Samos. Wiesbaden, 1977.
- R. B. Kebric, "A Note on Duris in Athens" in Classical Philology vol. 69 (1974) pp. 286–287.
- F. Landucci Gattinoni, Duride di Samo. Roma, 1997.
- L. Okin, Studies on Duris of Samos. University of Michigan dissertation, 1974.
- L. Okin, "A Hellenistic Historian Looks at Mythology" in Panhellenica (Lawrence, Kansas, 1980).
- P. Pédech, Trois historiens méconnus: Théopompe, Duris, Phylarque. Paris, 1989.
- E. Schwartz, "Duris (3)" in Paulys Realencyclopädie der classischen Altertumswissenschaft: neue Bearbeitung (Stuttgart: J. B. Metzler, 1894-1980) vol. 5 pt 2 cols 1853-1856.
- F. W. Walbank, "History and Tragedy" in Historia vol. 9 (1960) pp. 216–234.
- C. Baron, Timaeus of Tauromenium and Hellenistic Historiography (2012) pp. 247–255.

=== Other encyclopedias ===
- M. von Albrecht, "Duris (1)" in Der kleine Pauly ed. Konrat Ziegler, Walther Sontheimer (Munich: Artemis, 1975).
- D. Bowder, "Duris of Samos" in Who Was Who in the Greek World (Ithaca, NY: Cornell UP, 1982) pp. 101–102.
- "Duris of Samos" in The Columbia Encyclopedia, 6th ed. (2008).
- J. Hazel, "Duris (2)" in J. Hazel, Who's Who in the Greek World (London, 1999) p. 89.
- R. Schmitt, "Duris of Samos" in Encyclopædia Iranica. OCLC 311688910
