= Ephorus the Younger =

Ancient Greek historian (3rd ct. AD)

Ephorus or Ephoros (Ancient Greek: Ἔφορος; fl. 3rd century AD) of Kyme in Aeolia, in Asia Minor, was an ancient Greek historian in the Roman Empire during Late Antiquity. He is called "the Younger" to distinguish him from Ephorus, his earlier colleague from the same town.

Ephorus the Younger is mentioned only in the Suda, according to which he wrote a history of Galienus in twenty-seven books, a work on Corinth, one on the Aleuadae, and a few others. The name Galienus in this account is only a correction of Volaterranus, for the common reading in the Suda is Galênou.

It is disputed whether the writer Ephorus mentioned in the Suda actually existed and, if so, whether his name was a pseudonym.
