= Sukari mine =

Gold mine in Egypt

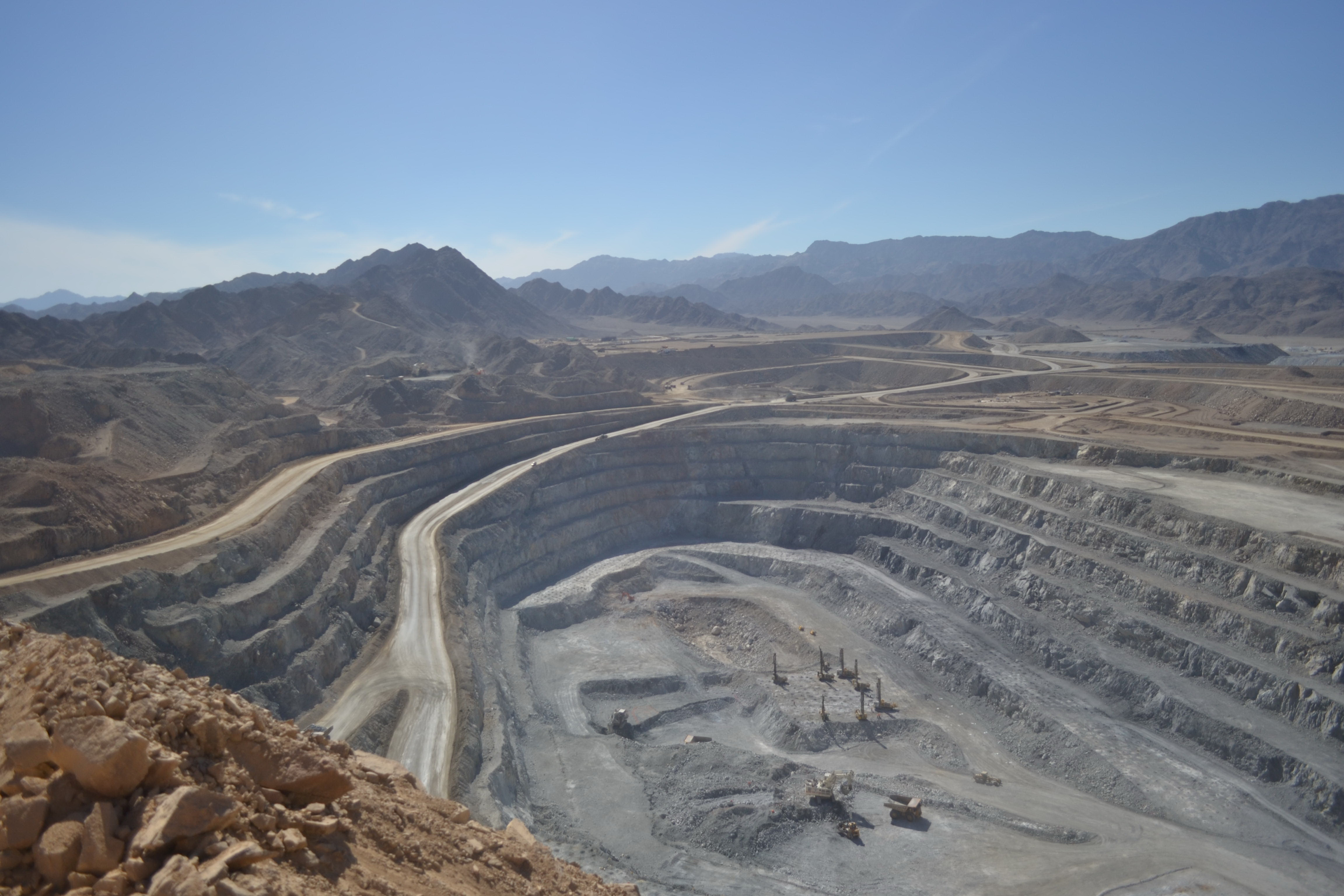

- Location within Egypt
- Location: Red Sea Governorate, Egypt; 24°57′25″N 34°42′36″E
- Products: Gold
- Production: ~450,000oz annually (2023)
- Opened: 2009
- Company: AngloGold Ashanti plc

The Sukari mine or Alsukari mine (Arabic: السكري Al-Sukkari, Egyptian pronunciation: El-Sokkari) is a gold mine located in the Nubian Desert/Eastern Desert, 25km from Marsa Alam, on the Red Sea, in Egypt. The Sukari mine is Egypt's first modern gold mine.

Egypt was known in the ancient world as being a source of gold, and one of the earliest available maps shows a gold mine at this location.

Today. Sukari is a combination of an open-pit mine and an underground mine. The site is supplied by a 30km-long pipeline bringing water from the Red Sea.

== History ==
The $265-million project began gold production in 2009 with 850 workers.

== Archaeology ==
In 2025, Egypt's Ministry of Tourism and Antiquities announced the discovery of an ancient gold processing complex at Sukari, dating to the Third Intermediate Period. Due to ongoing mining operations, the site was relocated to a safer area. The complex features grinding and crushing stations, filtration basins, and clay furnaces used for gold smelting.

Close to the site, a residential district housed workers, with structures spanning the Ptolemaic, Roman, and Islamic periods. Excavations yielded 628 ostraca inscribed in hieroglyphic, demotic, and Greek, alongside bronze coins, terracotta figurines, and stone statuettes of Bastet and Harpocrates.
