= Cratippus of Athens =

4th-century BC Athenian historian

Cratippus (Ancient Greek: Κράτιππος; fl. c. 375 BC) was a Greek historian. There are only three or four references to him in ancient literature, and his importance derives from him being identified by several scholars (e.g. Blass) with the author of the historical fragment discovered by Grenfell and Hunt. The fragment itself was published in Oxyrhynchus Papyri, vol. v, and is known as the Hellenica Oxyrhynchia. It may be regarded as a fairly certain inference from a passage in Plutarch (De Gloria Atheniensium, p. 345 E, ed. Bernardakis, ii. p. 455) that he was an Athenian writer, intermediate in date between Thucydides and Xenophon, and that his work continued the narrative of Thucydides, from the point at which the latter historian stopped (410 BC) down to the Battle of Cnidus.

A recent edition of the surviving papyrus fragments is V. Bartoletti, Hellenica Oxyrhynchia (Leipzig, 1959), which includes a bibliography.
