= Theopompus =

Greek historian and rhetorician (c. 380 – c. 315 BCE)

Theopompus (Ancient Greek: Θεόπομπος, Theópompos; c. 380 BCE – c. 315 BCE) was an ancient Greek historian and rhetorician student of Isocrates.

== Biography ==
=== Early life and education ===
Theopompus was born on the Aegean island of Chios in 378 or 377 BCE. In his early youth, he spent time at Athens, with his father Damasistratus, who had been exiled for his Laconian sympathies. In Athens, he became a pupil of Isocrates, and rapidly made progress in rhetoric; we are told that Isocrates said Ephorus required the spur but Theopompus the bit.

He composed epideictic speeches, in which he attained to proficiency. In 352–351 BCE Theopompus won the prize of oratory given by Artemisia II of Caria in honour of her husband; Isocrates himself among the competitors. It is said to have been the advice of his teacher that finally determined his career as an historian—a career for which he was peculiarly qualified owing to his abundant patrimony and his wide knowledge of men and places. Through the influence of Alexander III, he was permitted to return to Chios around 333 BCE, and was for some time as one of the leaders of the aristocratic party in his native town. After Alexander's death, he was again expelled, and took refuge with Ptolemy in Egypt. There he appears to have met with a cold reception. The exact date of his death is not known, but scholars place it around 320 BCE.

== Career and Works ==
The works of Theopompus are chiefly historical, and are much quoted by later writers. They include an Epitome of Herodotus's Histories (whether this work is disputed), the Hellenica (Ἑλληνικά), the History of Philip, several panegyrics and hortatory addresses, the chief of which is the Letter to Alexander.

=== The Hellenica ===
The Hellenica treats the history of Greece, in twelve books,. It begins where in 411, where Thucydides ends, to 394 BCE or the date of the Battle of Cnidus. Of this work, only a few fragments were known up till 1907. The papyrus fragment of a Greek historian of the 4th century BCE, discovered by B. P. Grenfell and A. S. Hunt, and published by them in Oxyrhynchus Papyri (Vol. 5, 1908), was recognized by Eduard Meyer, Ulrich von Wilamowitz-Moellendorff and Georg Busolt as a portion of the Hellenica. This identification is disputed by Friedrich Blass, J. B. Bury, E. M. Walker and others, who instead attribute the fragment dealing with the events of the year 395 BCE to Cratippus.

=== History of Philip II ===
Theopompus's most significant work, the Philippica, consists of fifty-eight books which details the reign of Philip II of Macedon. Despite its fragmented state, modern scholarship offers insights into its themes and Theopompus's historiographical approach. Unlike many of his peers, Theopompus offered a nuanced portrayal of Philip. He depicts him not merely as a conqueror but as a figure whose reign brought about significant moral and social destruction. The "Philippica" was more than a historical record. It is moral commentary on the corruption of Philip's court. Theopompus criticizes the moral decline which accompanied Philip's expansionist policies. He'd draw parallels between personal vices of individuals and the larger societal corruption.

Also, he detailed accounts of various regions and their political and social conditions. By doing so, he could share his belief in the interconnectedness of moral and political decay in different societies.

A far more elaborate work was the history of Philip's reign (360–336 BCE), with digressions on the names and customs of the various races and countries of which he had occasion to speak, which were so numerous that Philip V of Macedon reduced the bulk of the history from 58 to 16 books by cutting out those parts which had no connection with Macedonia. It was from this history that Trogus Pompeius (of whose Historiae Philippicae we possess the epitome by Justin) derived much of his material. Fifty-three books were extant in the time of Photius (9th century), who read them, and has left us an epitome of the 12th book. Several fragments, chiefly anecdotes and strictures of various kinds upon the character of nations and individuals, are preserved by Athenaeus, Plutarch and others. Of the Letter to Alexander we possess one or two fragments cited by Athenaeus, criticizing severely the immorality and dissipations of Harpalus.

The artistic unity of his work suffered severely from the frequent and lengthy digressions, of which the most important was On the Athenian Demagogues in the 10th book of the Philippica, containing a bitter attack on many of the chief Athenian statesmen, and generally recognized as having been freely used by Plutarch in several of the Lives. The Marvels is a lengthy digression inserted into books 8 and 9.

Another fault of Theopompus was his excessive fondness for romantic and incredible stories; a collection of some of these was afterwards made and published under his name. He was also severely blamed in antiquity for his censoriousness, and throughout his fragments no feature is more striking than this. On the whole, however, he appears to have been fairly impartial. Theompopus censures Philip severely for drunkenness and immorality while warmly praising Demosthenes.

== Mention by others ==
Aristotle mentions the conception and testimony of Theopompus about the inequity of slavery, in Politics. Jewish historian Flavius Josephus writes that Demetrius of Phalerum, in response to Ptolemy II Philadelphus asking why the Jewish Law had not been mentioned by any of his scribes or poets, told that due to the divine nature of the documents, any who endeavored to write about it had been afflicted by a distemper. He continued, saying that Theopompus once endeavored to write about the Jewish Law, but became disturbed in his mind for 30 days, whereupon during some intermission of his distemper he prayed for healing and determined to leave off his attempt to write, and was cured thereby. A passage from Theopompus is given by Athenaeus in his Deipnosophistae. Claudius Aelianus quotes both Theopompus and Lycus of Rhegium as sources on the crop-protection practices of the Adriatic Veneti.

== Modern Scholarship ==
Modern scholarship by historians such as Gordon Shrimpton and W. Robert Connor have re-evaluated Theopompus's contributions to historiography. Shrimpton emphasizes Theopompus's refined portrayal of Phillip II. He argues that Theopompus's work reflected a sophisticated understanding of the nuances of power and corruption. Connor highlights Theopompus's disillusionment with the moral state of Greece. This presents him as a critical observer and recorder of society.

Riccardo Vattoune's analysis further examines Theopompus's innovations in methodology. The chapter explores how Theopompus approached writing of history, specifically his use of sources and his treatment of historical events.

One key aspect discussed is Theopompus's interest in "invisible" parts of history such as motivations, emotions, and character traits. These parts of history are not readily apparent from the historical record alone, but his work preserves that part of history. Additionally, Vattuone dives into Theopompus's use of speeches, anecdotes, and character sketch's to give life to these invisible parts of history. Overall, the chapter provides insight into Theopompus's innovations in the field of historiography.
