= Diyllus =

Late 4th/early 3rd-century BC Greek historian

Diyllus (Ancient Greek: Δίυλλος), probably the son of Phanodemus the Atthidographer (a chronicler of the local history of Athens and Attica), wrote a universal history of the years 357–296 BC. His work seems to have been a continuation of Ephorus' history, and was itself continued by Psaon of Plataea. The work was in 26 books, though only fragments survive. Both the historian Diodorus Siculus and the biographer Plutarch valued Diyllus as a competent authority.
