= Herodotus =

Greek historian and geographer (c. 484–c. 425 BC)

- Ἡρόδοτος
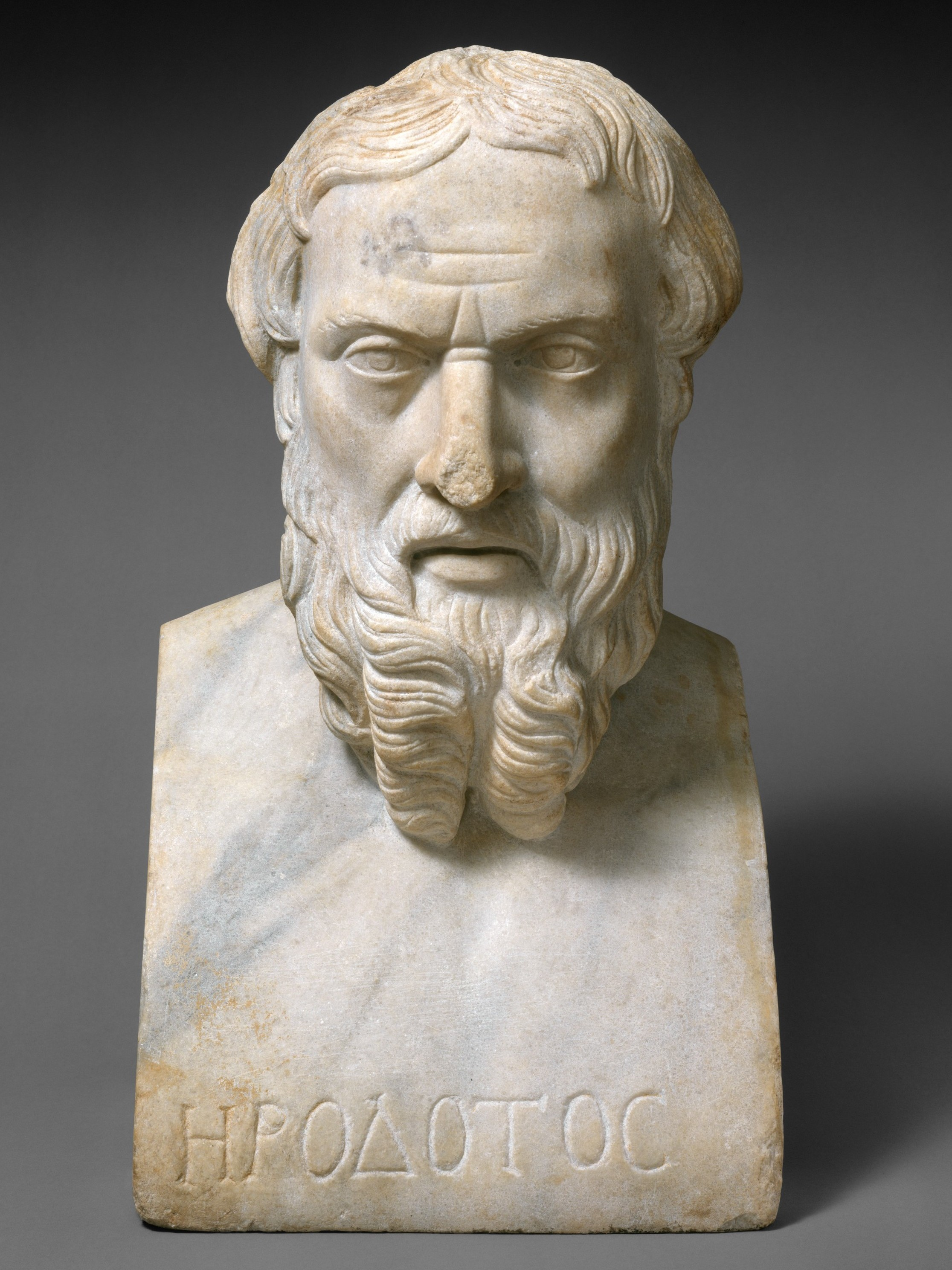
- A Roman copy (2nd century AD) of a Greek bust of Herodotus from the first half of the 4th century BC
- Born: c. 484 BC; Halicarnassus, Caria, Asia Minor, Achaemenid Empire
- Died: c. 425 BC (aged approx. 59); Thurii, Calabria, or Pella, Macedon
- Occupation: Historian
- Notable work: Histories
- Parents: Lyxes (father); Dryotus (mother)
- Relatives: Theodorus (brother); Panyassis (uncle or cousin)

Herodotus (Note: /həˈrɒdətəs/ hə-ROD-ə-təs) (Ancient Greek: Ἡρόδοτος, romanised: Hēródotos; c. 484 – c. 425 BC) was a Greek historian and geographer from the Greek city of Halicarnassus (now Bodrum, Turkey), under Persian control in the 5th century BC, and a later citizen of Thurii in modern Calabria, Italy. He wrote the Histories, a detailed account of the Greco-Persian Wars, among other subjects such as the rise of the Achaemenid dynasty of Cyrus. He has been described as "The Father of History", a title conferred on him by the ancient Roman orator Cicero.

The Histories primarily cover the lives of prominent kings and famous battles such as Marathon, Thermopylae, Artemisium, Salamis, Plataea, and Mycale. His work deviates from the main topics to provide a cultural, ethnographical, geographical, and historiographical background that forms an essential part of the narrative and provides readers with a wellspring of additional information.

Herodotus was criticised in his times for his inclusion of "legends and fanciful accounts" in his work. The contemporaneous historian Thucydides, who covered the Peloponnesian War in his History of the Peloponnesian War, would separately accuse Herodotus of making up stories for entertainment. Herodotus retorted that he reported what he could see and what he was told.

== Life ==
Scholars traditionally turn to Herodotus's own writing for reliable information about his life, supplemented with archaic yet much later sources, such as the Byzantine Suda, a 10th-century encyclopaedia which possibly took its information from traditional accounts. Still, the challenge is great:

The data are so few – they rest upon such late and slight authority; they are so improbable or so contradictory, that to compile them into a biography is like building a house of cards, which the first breath of criticism will blow to the ground. Still, certain points may be approximately fixed [...]

— G. Rawlinson

=== Childhood ===
Herodotus was, according to his own statement at the beginning of his work, a native of Halicarnassus in Anatolia, and it is generally accepted that he was born there around 485 BC. The Suda says his family was influential, that he was the son of Lyxes and Dryo and the brother of Theodorus, and that he was also related to Panyassis – an epic poet of the time. It is likely that Herodotus was at least partially Hellenised Carian in origin, given that Lyxes and Panyassis are Carian names. Halicarnassus was then within the Persian Empire, making Herodotus a Persian subject.

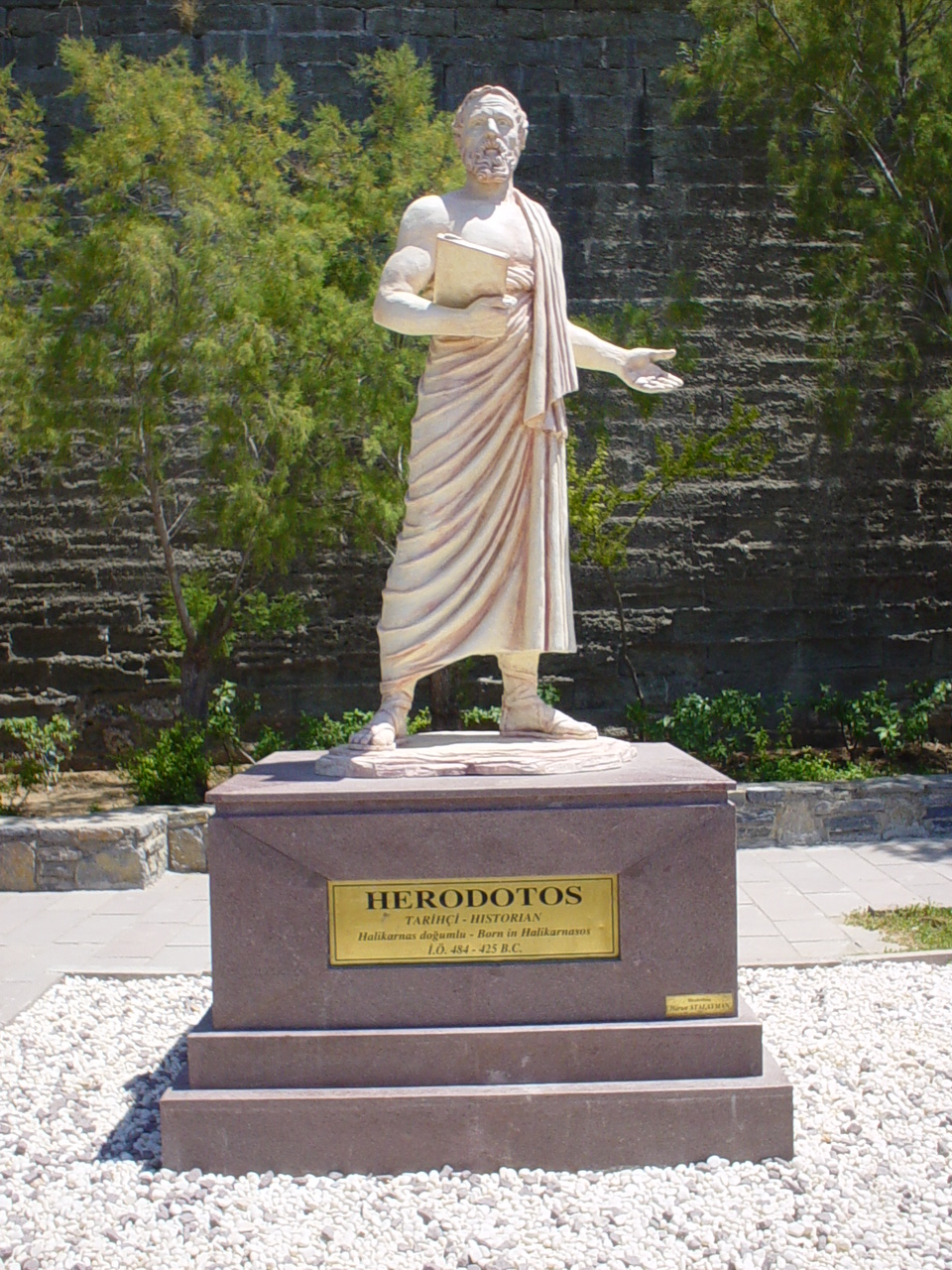
Romanticised statue of Herodotus in his hometown of Halicarnassus, modern Bodrum, Turkey

Herodotus wrote his Histories in the Ionian dialect, in spite of being born in a Dorian settlement. According to the Suda, Herodotus learned the Ionian dialect as a boy living on the island of Samos, to which he had fled with his family from the oppressions of Lygdamis, tyrant of Halicarnassus and grandson of Artemisia. Panyassis, the epic poet related to Herodotus, is reported to have taken part in a failed uprising.

The Suda also states that Herodotus later returned home to lead the revolt that eventually overthrew the despot. Due to recent discoveries of inscriptions at Halicarnassus dated to about Herodotus's time, it is now known that Ionic Greek was used in Halicarnassus in some official documents, so there is no need to assume (like the Suda) that he must have learned the dialect elsewhere. The Suda is the only source placing Herodotus as the heroic liberator of his birthplace, casting doubt upon the veracity of that romantic account.

=== Early travels ===
As Herodotus himself reveals, Halicarnassus, though a Dorian city, had ended its close relations with its Dorian neighbours after an unseemly quarrel (I,144), and it had helped pioneer Greek trade with Egypt (II, 178). It was, therefore, an outward-looking, international-minded port within the Persian Empire, and the historian's family could well have had contacts in other countries under Persian rule, facilitating his travels and his research.

Herodotus's eyewitness accounts indicate that he traveled in Egypt in association with Athenians, probably sometime after 454 BC or possibly earlier, after an Athenian fleet had assisted the uprising against Persian rule in 460–454 BC. He probably traveled to Tyre next and then down the Euphrates to Babylon. For some reason, possibly associated with local politics, he subsequently found himself unpopular in Halicarnassus and, sometime around 447 BC, migrated to Periclean Athens – a city whose people and democratic institutions he openly admired (V, 78). Athens was also the place where he came to know the local topography (VI, 137; VIII, 52–55) and leading citizens such as the Alcmaeonids, a clan whose history is featured frequently in his writing.

According to Plutarch, (Note: Plutarch De Malign. Herod. II p. 862 A, cited by.) Herodotus was granted a financial reward by the Athenian assembly in recognition of his work. Plutarch, using Diyllus as a source, says this was 10 talents.

=== Later life ===
In 443 BC or shortly afterwards, he migrated to Thurii, in modern Calabria, as part of an Athenian-sponsored colony. Aristotle refers to a version of the Histories written by "Herodotus of Thurium", and some passages in the Histories have been interpreted as proof that he wrote about Magna Graecia from personal experience there (IV, 15,99; VI, 127). According to Ptolemaeus Chennus, a late source summarised in the Library of Photius, Plesirrhous the Thessalian, the hymnographer, was the eromenos of Herodotus and his heir. This account has also led some historians to assume Herodotus died childless. Intimate knowledge of some events in the first years of the Peloponnesian War (VI, 91; VII, 133, 233; IX, 73) suggests that he returned to Athens, in which case it is possible that he died there during an outbreak of the plague. It is also possible he died in Macedonia instead, after obtaining the patronage of the court there, or else he died back in Thurii. There is nothing in the Histories that can be dated to later than 430 BC with any certainty, and it is generally assumed that he died not long afterwards, possibly before his sixtieth year.

=== Author and orator ===
Herodotus would have made his researches known to the larger world through oral recitations to a public crowd. John Marincola writes in his introduction to the Penguin edition of the Histories that there are certain identifiable pieces in the early books of Herodotus's work which could be labeled as "performance pieces". These portions of the research seem independent and "almost detachable", so that they might have been set aside by the author for the purposes of an oral performance. The intellectual matrix of the 5th century, Marincola suggests, comprised many oral performances in which philosophers would dramatically recite such detachable pieces of their work. The idea was to criticise previous arguments on a topic and emphatically and enthusiastically insert their own in order to win over the audience.

It was conventional in Herodotus's day for authors to "publish" their works by reciting them at popular festivals. According to Lucian, Herodotus took his finished work straight from Anatolia to the Olympic Games and read the entire Histories to the assembled spectators in one sitting, receiving rapturous applause at the end of it. According to a very different account by an ancient grammarian, (Note: Montfaucon's Bibliothec. Coisl. Cod. clxxvii p. 609, cited by.) Herodotus refused to begin reading his work at the festival of Olympia until some clouds offered him a bit of shade – by which time the assembly had dispersed. (Hence the proverbial expression "Herodotus and his shade" to describe someone who misses an opportunity through delay.) Herodotus's recitation at Olympia was a favourite theme among ancient writers, and there is another interesting variation on the story to be found in the Suda: that of Photius (Note: Photius Bibliothec. Cod. lx p. 59, cited by Ralinson) and Tzetzes, (Note: Tzetzes Chil. 1.19, cited by.) in which a young Thucydides happened to be in the assembly with his father, and burst into tears during the recital. Herodotus observed prophetically to the boy's father: "Your son's soul yearns for knowledge."

Eventually, Thucydides and Herodotus became close enough for both to be interred in Thucydides's tomb in Athens. Such at least was the opinion of Marcellinus in his Life of Thucydides. (Note: Marcellinus, in Vita. Thucyd. p. ix, cited by.) According to the Suda, he was buried in Macedonian Pella and in the agora in Thurii.

== Place in history ==
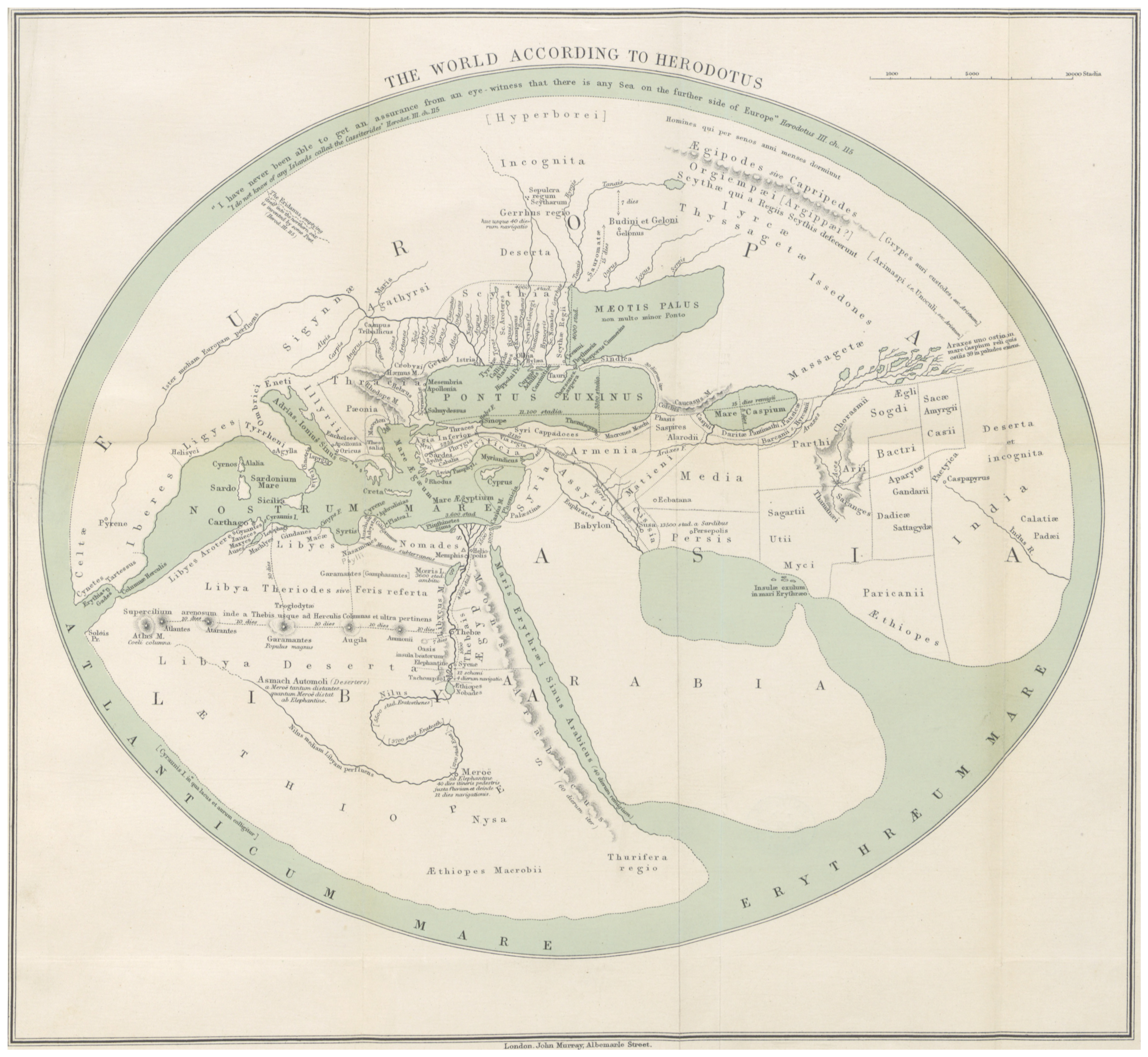
Reconstructed map of the world based on the writings of Herodotus

Herodotus announced the purpose and scope of his work at the beginning of his Histories:

Here are presented the results of the inquiry carried out by Herodotus of Halicarnassus. The purpose is to prevent the traces of human events from being erased by time, and to preserve the fame of the important and remarkable achievements produced by both Greeks and non-Greeks; among the matters covered is, in particular, the cause of the hostilities between Greeks and non-Greeks.

— Herodotus, The Histories (tr. R. Waterfield, 2008)

=== Predecessors ===
His record of the achievements of others was an achievement in itself, though the extent of it has been debated. Herodotus's place in history and his significance may be understood according to the traditions within which he worked. His work is the earliest Greek prose to have survived intact. Dionysius of Halicarnassus, a literary critic of Augustan Rome, listed seven predecessors of Herodotus, describing their works as simple unadorned accounts of their own and other cities and people, Greek or foreign, including popular legends, sometimes melodramatic and naïve, often charming – all traits that can be found in the work of Herodotus himself. (Note: , citing Dionysius On Thucydides)

Modern historians regard the chronology as uncertain, but according to the ancient account, these predecessors included Dionysius of Miletus, Charon of Lampsacus, Hellanicus of Lesbos, Xanthus of Lydia and, the best attested of them all, Hecataeus of Miletus. Of these, only fragments of Hecataeus's works survived, and the authenticity of these is debatable, but they provide a glimpse into the kind of tradition within which Herodotus wrote his own Histories.

=== Contemporary and modern critics ===
It is on account of the many strange stories and the folk-tales he reported that his critics have branded him "The Father of Lies". Even his own contemporaries found reason to scoff at his achievement. In fact, one 19th-century scholar wondered whether Herodotus left his home in Greek Anatolia, migrating westwards to Athens and beyond, because his own countrymen had ridiculed his work, a circumstance possibly hinted at in an epitaph said to have been dedicated to Herodotus at one of his three supposed resting places, Thuria:

Herodotus the son of Sphynx
lies; in Ionic history without peer;
a Dorian born, who fled from slander's brand
and made in Thuria his new native land.

Yet it was in Athens where his most formidable contemporary critics could be found. In 425 BC, which is about the time that Herodotus is thought by many scholars to have died, the Athenian comic dramatist Aristophanes created The Acharnians, in which he blames the Peloponnesian War on the abduction of some prostitutes – a mocking reference to Herodotus, who reported the Persians' account of their wars with Greece, beginning with the rapes of the mythical heroines Io, Europa, Medea, and Helen.

Similarly, the Athenian historian Thucydides dismissed Herodotus as a story-teller. Thucydides, who had been trained in rhetoric, became the model for subsequent prose-writers as an author who seeks to appear firmly in control of his material, whereas with his frequent digressions Herodotus appeared to minimise (or possibly disguise) his authorial control. Moreover, Thucydides developed a historical topic more in keeping with the Greek world-view: focused on the context of the polis or city-state. The interplay of civilisations was more relevant to Greeks living in Anatolia, such as Herodotus himself, for whom life within a foreign civilisation was a recent memory.

Before the Persian crisis, history had been represented among the Greeks only by local or family traditions. The "Wars of Liberation" had given to Herodotus the first genuinely historical inspiration felt by a Greek. These wars showed him that there was a corporate life, higher than that of the city, of which the story might be told; and they offered to him as a subject the drama of the collision between East and West. With him, the spirit of history was born into Greece; and his work, called after the nine Muses, was indeed the first utterance of Clio.

— R. C. Jebb,

Though Herodotus is generally considered a reliable source of ancient history, many present-day historians believe that his accounts are at least partially inaccurate, attributing the observed inconsistencies in the Histories to exaggeration.

Another critic of Herodotus is Giambattista Vico, who, in the opening pages of his book New Science, states that although “Herodotus is called the father of Greek history, his books are for the most part filled with myths, and his style contains many Homeric elements”.

== See also ==
- Al-Masudi, known as the Herodotus of the Arabs
- Movses Khorenatsi, known as the Herodotus of the Armenians
- Herodotus Machine
- Historiography (the history of history and historians)
- Life of Homer (Pseudo-Herodotus)
- Sostratus of Aegina

== Critical editions ==
- C. Hude (ed.) Herodoti Historiae. Tomvs prior: Libros I–IV continens. (Oxford 1908)
- C. Hude (ed.) Herodoti Historiae. Tomvs alter: Libri V–IX continens. (Oxford 1908)
- H. B. Rosén (ed.) Herodoti Historiae. Vol. I: Libros I–IV continens. (Leipzig 1987)
- H. B. Rosén (ed.) Herodoti Historiae. Vol. II: Libros V–IX continens indicibus criticis adiectis (Stuttgart 1997)
- N. G. Wilson (ed.) Herodoti Historiae. Tomvs prior: Libros I–IV continens. (Oxford 2015)
- N. G. Wilson (ed.) Herodoti Historiae. Tomvs alter: Libri V–IX continens. (Oxford 2015)

== Translations ==
Several English translations of Herodotus's Histories are available in multiple editions, including:

- Henry Cary, translation 1849: text Internet Archive
- George Rawlinson, translation 1858–1860. Public domain; many editions available, although Everyman's Library and Wordsworth Classics editions are the most common ones still in print. (revised in 1935 by A. W. Lawrence)
- George Campbell Macaulay, translation 1890, published in two volumes. London: Macmillan and Co.
- A. D. Godley 1920; revised 1926. Reprinted 1931, 1946, 1960, 1966, 1975, 1981, 1990, 1996, 1999, 2004. Available in four volumes from Loeb Classical Library, Harvard University Press. ISBN 0-674-99130-3 Printed with Greek on the left and English on the right:
  - A. D. Godley Herodotus : The Persian Wars : Volume I : Books 1–2 (Cambridge, Massachusetts 1920)
  - A. D. Godley Herodotus : The Persian Wars : Volume II : Books 3–4 (Cambridge, Massachusetts 1921)
  - A. D. Godley Herodotus : The Persian Wars : Volume III : Books 5–7 (Cambridge, Massachusetts 1922)
  - A. D. Godley Herodotus : The Persian Wars : Volume IV : Books 8–9 (Cambridge, Massachusetts 1925)
- Aubrey de Sélincourt, originally 1954; revised by John Marincola in 1996. Several editions from Penguin Books available.
- David Grene, Chicago: University of Chicago Press, 1985.
- Robin Waterfield, with an Introduction and Notes by Carolyn Dewald, Oxford World Classics, 1997. ISBN 978-0-19-953566-8
- Andrea L. Purvis, The Landmark Herodotus, edited by Robert B. Strassler. Pantheon, 2007. ISBN 978-0-375-42109-9 with adequate ancillary information.
- Walter Blanco, Herodotus: The Histories: The Complete Translation, Backgrounds, Commentaries. Edited by Jennifer Tolbert Roberts. New York: W. W. Norton, 2013.
- Tom Holland, The Histories, Herodotus. Introduction and notes by Paul Cartledge. New York, Penguin, 2013.
