= Diodorus Siculus =

1st-century BC Greek historian

- Διόδωρος
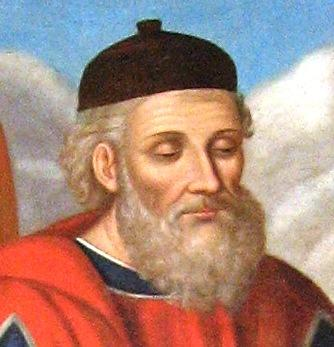
- Diodorus Siculus as depicted in a 19th-century fresco
- Born: fl. 1st century BC; Agira, Sicily
- Writing career
- Language: Ancient Greek
- Genre: History
- Notable work: Bibliotheca historica

Diodorus Siculus or Diodorus of Sicily (Ancient Greek: Διόδωρος, romanized: Diódōros; fl. 1st century BC) was an ancient Greek historian from Sicily. He is known for writing the monumental universal history Bibliotheca historica, in forty books, fifteen of which survive intact, between 60 and 30 BC. The history is arranged in three parts. The first covers mythic history up to the destruction of Troy, arranged geographically, describing regions around the world from Egypt, India and Arabia to Europe. The second covers the time from the Trojan War to the death of Alexander the Great. The third covers the period to about 60 BC. Bibliotheca, meaning 'library', acknowledges that he was drawing on the work of many other authors.

== Life ==
According to his own work, he was born in Agyrium in Sicily (now called Agira). With one exception, antiquity affords no further information about his life and doings beyond his written works. Only Jerome, in his Chronicon under the "year of Abraham 1968" (49 BC), writes, "Diodorus of Sicily, a writer of Greek history, became illustrious". However, his English translator, Charles Henry Oldfather, remarks on the "striking coincidence" that one of only two known Greek inscriptions from Agyrium (Inscriptiones Graecae XIV, 588) is the tombstone of one "Diodorus, the son of Apollonius" ("Διόδωρος ∙ Ἀπολλωνίου"). The final work attributed to him is from 21 BC.

== Work ==
Bibliotheca historica, 1746

Diodorus's universal history, which he named Bibliotheca historica (Ancient Greek: Βιβλιοθήκη Ἱστορική, "Historical Library"), was immense and consisted of 40 books, of which 1–5 and 11–20 survive: fragments of the lost books are preserved in Photius and the Excerpts of Constantine Porphyrogenitus.

It was divided into three sections. The first section (books I–VI) deals with the mythic history of the non-Hellenic and Hellenic tribes up to the destruction of Troy and is geographical in theme, describing the history and culture of Ancient Egypt (book I), of Mesopotamia, India, Scythia, and Arabia (II), of North Africa (III), and of Greece and Europe (IV–VI).

The next section (books VII–XVII) recounts the history of the world from the Trojan War down to the death of Alexander the Great. The last section (books XVII to the end) concerns the historical events from the successors of Alexander down to either 60 BC or the beginning of Julius Caesar's Gallic Wars. The end has been lost, so it is unclear whether Diodorus reached the beginning of the Gallic War as he promises at the beginning of his work or, as evidence suggests, old and tired from his labours, he stopped short at 60 BC.

Diodorus selected the name "Bibliotheca" in acknowledgment that he was assembling a composite work from many sources. Identified authors on whose works he drew include Hecataeus of Abdera, Ctesias of Cnidus, Ephorus, Theopompus, Hieronymus of Cardia, Duris of Samos, Diyllus, Philistus, Timaeus, Polybius, and Posidonius.

== See also ==
- Acadine
- Callon of Epidaurus
- Diophantus of Abae
- Hellenic historiography
- Historic recurrence
- Pliny the Elder
- Strabo

== Bibliography ==
- Ambaglio, Dino; Landucci Gattinoni, Franca; Bravi, Luigi (2008). Diodoro Siculo: Biblioteca storica: commento storico: introduzione generale. Storia. Ricerche (in Italian). Milano: V&P. pp. x, 145. ISBN 9788834315842.
- Buckley, Terry (1996). Aspects of Greek History 750-323 BC: A Source-based Approach. London: Routledge. ISBN 0-415-09958-7.
- Diodorus Siculus (1935). Library of History: Loeb Classical Library. Translated by Oldfather, C. H. Cambridge, MA.: Harvard University Press.
- Diodorus Siculus; H. Valesius; I. Rhodomannus; F. Ursinus (1814). The Historical Library of Diodorus the Sicilian in Fifteen Books to which are added the Fragments of Diodorus. Translated by G. Booth. London: J. Davis – via Google Books.
- Diodori Siculi (1798). Peter Wesseling; L. Rhodoman; G. Heyn; N. Eyring (eds.). Bibliothecae Historicae Libri Qui Supersunt: Nova Editio (in Ancient Greek and Latin). Argentorati: Societas Bipontina – via Internet Archive.
- Usher, Stephen (1969). The Historians of Greece and Rome. London: Hamish Hamilton. ISBN 0-2410-1527-8.
