= Memi =

MEMI (매미) is a South Korean singer and guitarist.

Memi may refer to:

- Memi Bečirovič (born 1961), Slovenian professional basketball coach
- Ministry of Energy (Brunei), formerly known as the Ministry of Energy, Manpower and Industry (MEMI)
- Khayali (died 1556), nicknamed Bekār Memi ("Memi the Bachelor"), Ottoman poet

== See also ==
- Memiş (disambiguation)
- Memmi (disambiguation)
- Memo (disambiguation)
