= Memmo =

Memmo may refer to:

- Marcantonio Memmo (1536–1615), 91st Doge of Venice
- Tribuno Memmo (died 991), 25th Doge of Venice
- Memmo Carotenuto (1908–1980), Italian actor
- Memmo di Filippuccio (fl. 1303–1345), Italian painter

== See also ==
- Memo (disambiguation)
- Memmi (disambiguation)
