= Mysuru–Chennai Express =

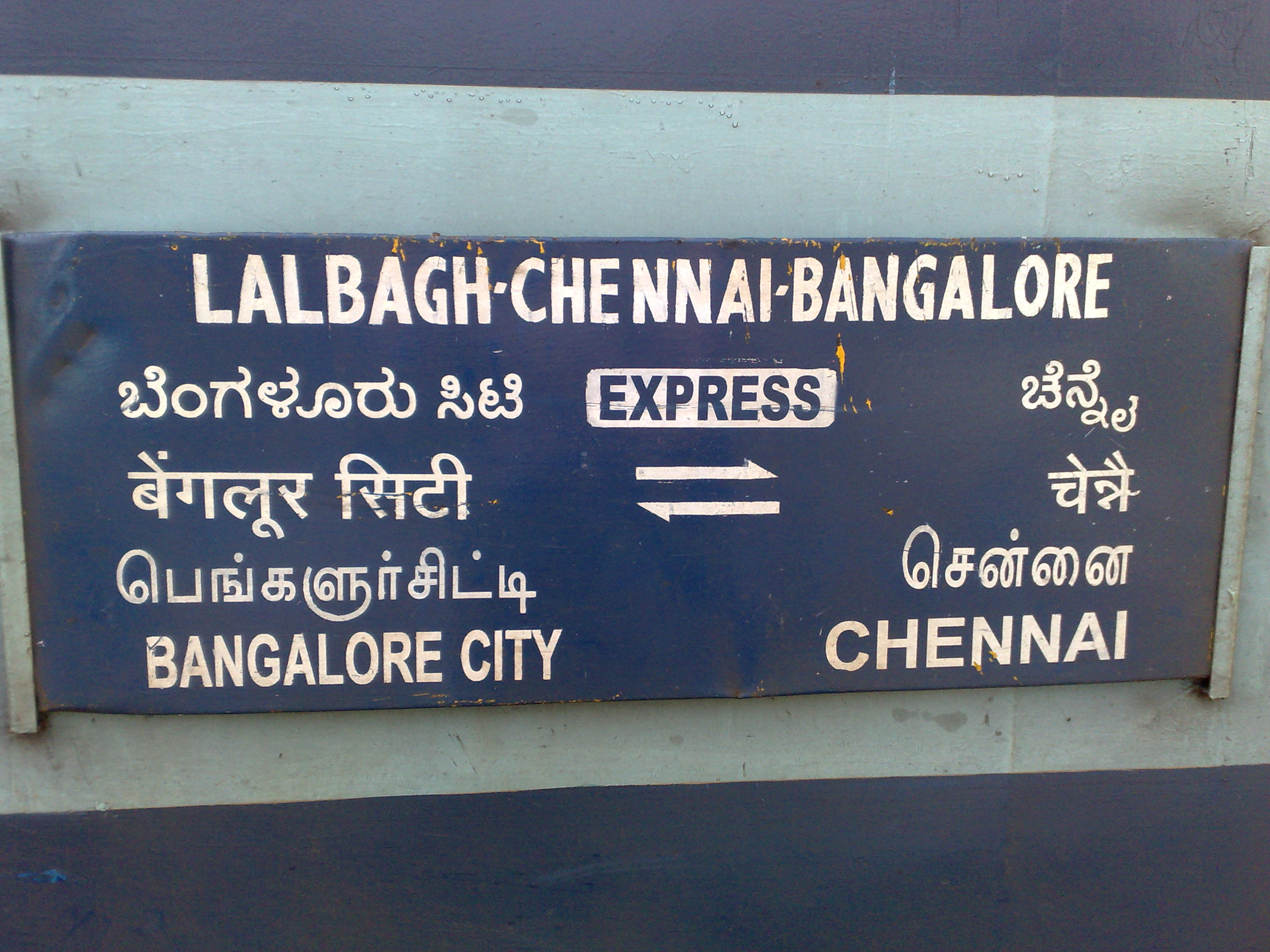
Mysuru Chennai SF Express

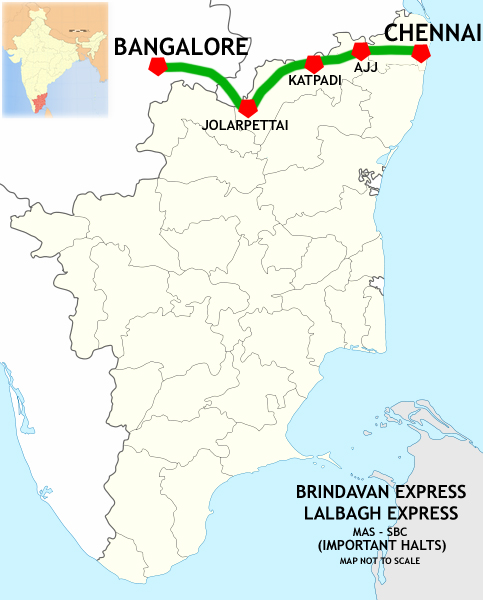
Mysuru Chennai SF Express (MyS – MAS) Route map

The Mysuru Chennai SF Express is a train in India, linking Mysuru Junction and Chennai Central.

== Timings ==
It leaves Mysuru Junction at 05:00 hrs. and reaches Puratchi Thalaivar Dr. M.G. Ramachandran Central Railway Station at around 14:30 hrs. In the return direction, it leaves Puratchi Thalaivar Dr. M.G. Ramachandran Central Railway Station at 13:35 hrs. and reaches Mysuru Junction at 2245 hrs. The train number is 12609 in the Chennai to Mysuru direction and 12610 in the Mysuru to Chennai direction. The train has around 24 coaches. It is categorized as a "Superfast Express..

The composition of this train is:

- AC chair car: 2
- Second class (reserved): 11
- Pantry: 1
- Unreserved: 4
- Luggage vans: 2

Loco Link: It runs on a complete electrified railway route and is regularly hauled by WAP7 of either Lallaguda, Royapuram or Krishnarajapuram Shed.

== Introduction & destinations ==
Mysuru–Chennai Express was introduced as the 6024 Bangalore City-Chennai Express by the Southern Railway. It traverses the 362 km distance in 6 hours and 30 minutes. The rake is now maintained by South Western Railway at KSR Bengaluru. The Chennai-Bangalore City express had the number 6023.

== Stoppages ==
This train stops at Tiruvallur, Arakkonam Junction, Sholinghur, Walajah Road, Mukundarayapuram, Katpadi Junction, Gudiyattam, Ambur, Vaniyambadi, Jolarpet Junction, Kuppam, Bangarpet, Malur, Whitefield, Krishnarajapuram, Bangalore East, Bangalore Cantonment, KSR Bengaluru, Kengeri, Ramanagaram, Channapatna, Madur, Mandya and Pandavapura . The train stops at Perambur towards Chennai direction.

== See also ==
- Brindavan Express
- Lal Bagh Express
- Yelagiri express
