= Songs for the Last View =

Studio album by Lacrimas Profundere
- Released: 27 June 2008
- Genre: Gothic metal, dark rock
- Label: Napalm Records
- Producer: John Fryer

Lacrimas Profundere chronology
Filthy Notes for Frozen Hearts (2006)	Songs for the Last View (2008)	The Grandiose Nowhere (2010)

Songs for the Last View is the eighth studio album by German gothic metal Lacrimas Profundere, released on 27 June 2008 in mainland Europe, with a US/Canada release on 15 July.

== Track listing ==
All songs written and arranged by Lacrimas Profundere.

No.	Title	Length
1.	"The Last View"	0:56
2.	"A Pearl"	3:00
3.	"The Shadow I Once Kissed"	3:22
4.	"Veins"	2:47
5.	"We Shouldn't Be Here"	3:32
6.	"And God's Ocean"	5:37
7.	"Suicide Sun"	3:51
8.	"Dear Amy"	3:05
9.	"A Dead Man"	3:58
10.	"Sacrificial Lamb"	5:12
11.	"Lullaby for a Weeping Girl"	3:31
12.	"While"	5:15

=== Bonus limited edition digipak tracks ===
13. "Burn"
14. "The Beauty of Who You Are"
15. "The Shadow I Once Kissed (2nd Version)"
16. "Sweet Letter C"

=== Bonus DVD ===
Bonus DVD includes:

- Live footage:
1. "Intro" - :59
2. "My Velvet Little Darkness" – 3:17
3. "Again It's Over" – 3:29
4. "Sweet Caroline" – 3:04
5. "Amber Girl" – 3:11
6. "My Mescaline" – 4:55
7. "For Bad Times" – 4:05
8. "Should" – 3:54
9. "To Love Here on Knees" – 3:02
10. "Sarah Lou" – 4:09
11. "One Hopes Evening" – 3:55
12. "Ave End" – 5:07

Also included:

- "A Pearl" Music Video – 3:11
- Trailer Songs for the Last View – 1:36
- Making of "A Pearl" – 4:12
- Tour Movie – 14:12

A special pre-order edition of the album is available through the band's website. This includes a DVD and four bonus songs.

"A Pearl" was the first single from the album and was released as a download on 27 June 2008. It also featured a non-album song called "The Love That Doesn't Care". A video was released for "A Pearl".

A special downloadable piano version of "Sarah Lou" was given out to pre-orders from Amazon and EMP.

== Singles ==
"A Pearl"

1. "A Pearl" (Album Version) – 03:00
2. "A Love That Doesn't Care" (Non-Album Track) – 03:47

"And God's Ocean"

1. "And God's Ocean" (Single Version) – 03:47
2. "Sacrificial Lamb" (Acoustic Sad Version) – 04:31

== Personnel ==
- Rob Vitacca – vocals
- Oliver Nicholas Schmid – guitars
- Tony Berger – guitars
- Christian Steiner – keyboards, synthesizers
- Daniel Lechner – bass
- Willi Wurm – drums, percussion
- Christopher Schmid – backing vocals

Production

- Recorded, produced, engineered and mixed by John Fryer
- Mastered by Roger Lian
