= ...And the Wings Embraced Us =

And the Wings Embraced Us
- 2003 reissue cover

Studio album by Lacrimas Profundere
- Released: December 1995
- Recorded: April–May 1995, Zinnkopf Audio
- Genres: Death/doom, doom metal, gothic metal
- Length: 37:38
- Label: Perverted Taste
- Producer: Lacrimas Profundere

Lacrimas Profundere chronology
And the Wings Embraced Us (1995)	La Naissance D'Un Rêve (1997)

...And the Wings Embraced Us is the premiere studio album by the German gothic metal band Lacrimas Profundere. It was originally released in 1995, and remastered and re-released in 2002.

== Track listing ==
- All songs written by Christopher Schmid (lyrics) and Oliver Schmid (music).

No.	Title	Length
1.	"Snow"	7:48
2.	"Perfume of Withered Roses"	7:54
3.	"Amorous"	7:16
4.	"Eternal Sleep"	5:02
5.	"Autumn Morning"	8:01
6.	"Embracing Wings"	1:47

== Personnel ==
- Christopher Schmid – vocals
- Anja Hotzendorfer – violin, female vocals
- Oliver Nikolas Schmid – guitars
- Markus Lapper – bass
- Christian Greisberger – drums
- Eva Stoger – flute, keyboards
