= Memorandum (disambiguation) =

A memorandum, or memo, is a document recording notes or observations.

Memorandum may also refer to:

- Memorandum (album), by Lacrimas Profundere
- Memorandum (film), a 1965 documentary film
- Memorandum Recordings, an Australian record label
- The Memorandum, a 1965 play by Václav Havel

== See also ==
- Memo (disambiguation)
