= The Grandiose Nowhere =

Studio album by Lacrimas Profundere
- Released: (European Union) April 30, 2010 (United States) May 4, 2010
- Genre: Gothic metal
- Label: Napalm Records

Lacrimas Profundere chronology
Songs for the Last View (2008)	The Grandiose Nowhere (2010)

The Grandiose Nowhere is the ninth studio album by Lacrimas Profundere. It was released in 2010.

== Track listing ==
No.	Title	Length
1.	"Be Mine In Tears"	3:24
2.	"The Letter"	3:53
3.	"Lips"	3:53
4.	"I Don't Care"	4:02
5.	"Her Occasion of Sin"	2:42
6.	"A Plea"	3:09
7.	"Not for Love"	3:24
8.	"The Fear of Being Alone"	3:06
9.	"My Little Fear"	3:29
10.	"Side"	3:48
11.	"Dead Heart Serenade"	3:23
12.	"No Matter Where You Shoot Me Down"	4:05

=== Bonus limited edition Digipack tracks ===
13. "All Is Suffering"
14. "Of Words and Rain"

== Singles ==
Lips

1. "Lips" - 3:52
2. "I Don't Care" (The Downward Remix) - 3:38
3. "A Plea" (Basement Sessions) - 3:21
4. "Lips" (Video) - 3:55

== Outtakes ==
1. "One Hope's Evening" (Acoustic Version) - 3:38
- Released Only like a Christmas gift for a limited period and posted in the Facebook of the band
