= La Naissance d'un rêve =

Studio album by Lacrimas Profundere
- Released: December 1997
- Recorded: April–May 1997
- Genre: Death/doom, gothic metal, symphonic metal
- Length: 55:28
- Label: Witchhunt Records

Lacrimas Profundere chronology
And the Wings Embraced Us (1995)	La Naissance d'un rêve (1997)	Memorandum (1999)

La Naissance d'un rêve is the second album by the German band Lacrimas Profundere. It was released through Witchhunt records and recorded at Zinnkopf Audio in Siegsdorf, Germany. The title is French for 'The Birth of a Dream.'

The album was re-released three times: In 2002 in Korea containing two bonus tracks "The Meadows of Light" and "Eternal Sleep (Orchestral Version)" produced by Sail Productions. Also, in the same year, it was re-released as a part of "The Fallen Years" double CD album, produced by "Scarecrow Records (Mexico)". And lastly in 2003 in Russia with one bonus track.

== Track listing ==
No.	Title	Length
1.	"A Fairy's Breath"	12:54
2.	"Priamus"	11:18
3.	"Lilienmeer"	2:32
4.	"The Gesture of the Gist"	10:15
5.	"An Orchid for My Withering Garden"	6:30
6.	"Enchanted and in Silent Beauty"	10:44

== Personnel ==
Christopher Schmid: Vocals
Anja Hötzendorfer: Violin and Female Vocals
Oliver Nikolas Schmid: Guitars
Markus Lapper: Bass
Stefan Eireiner: Drums
Christian Steiner: Keyboards
Eva Stöger: Flute
