= Thalatta! Thalatta! =

Ancient Greek soldier's cheer

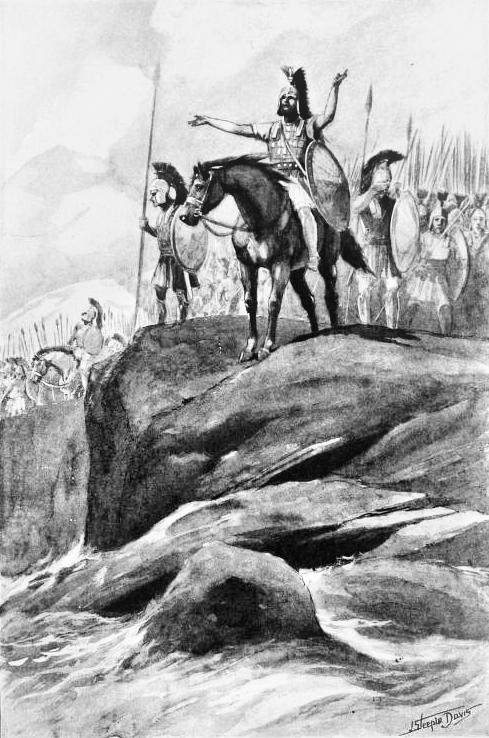
Xenophon and the Ten Thousand uttering the cry

Thálatta! Thálatta! (Greek: Θάλαττα! θάλαττα! — "The Sea! The Sea!") or Thálassa! Thálassa! was the cry of joy uttered by the roaming Ten Thousand when they saw the Black Sea from Mount Theches after participating in Cyrus the Younger's failed march against the Persian Empire in the year 401 BC. The mountain was only a five-day march away from the friendly coastal city Trapezus. The story is told by Xenophon in his Anabasis. The date of the incident itself is believed to be in the early months of 400 BC.

== Xenophon's account ==
Xenophon describes the scene as follows:

From there they went through four days’ march and twenty parasangs to a large, prosperous and populous city which was called Gymnias. From this country the ruler sent a guide for the Greeks, so that he could lead them through the country which was an enemy of theirs. When that man came he said that he would lead them in five days to a place from which they would see sea; if not, he declared that he was a dead man. And as he led them, when he brought them into the enemy territory, he began encouraging them to burn and lay waste the country. From which it became clear that it was for this reason he had come, not because of his goodwill towards the Greeks. And they arrive on top of the mountain on the fifth day. The mountain was called Theches. And when the first men arrived on top of the mountain and saw the sea below them, there was a lot of shouting. When Xenophon and the rearguard heard this, they thought that some other enemies were attacking them from in front. For from behind also the people from the land which was burning were following them, and the rearguard had killed some of them and taken some of them prisoner after making an ambush, and they had captured about 20 wickerwork shields covered with raw hide from oxen with the hair still on them.

But when the shouting was getting louder and nearer, and those who were continually arriving kept running fast towards those who were continually shouting, it seemed to Xenophon to be something more serious, and mounting on a horse and taking with him Lycius and the cavalrymen he began going to help. And very soon they hear the soldiers shouting ‘Sea! Sea!’ and passing the word along. Suddenly all of them together began running, including the rearguards, and the pack animals and horses were made to gallop. And when they arrived on the summit, then they began embracing one another and the generals and the captains, weeping. And suddenly, when someone passed the word along, the soldiers bring some stones and make a large cairn. Then they placed a quantity of rawhide skins on it as an offering, and staffs, and the captured shields, and the guide began cutting up the shields himself and encouraging the others to do so. After that the Greeks send the guide away after giving him gifts from the common property – a horse and a silver libation-bowl and a Persian outfit and ten darics; he kept asking particularly for their finger-rings and he took a lot of them from the soldiers. And after pointing out a village to them where they would encamp and the road which they would take into the territory of the Macrones, when evening came, he departed, going away during the night.

== Location ==
Several attempts have been made in recent years to discover the exact location of the mountain, Theches, from where Xenophon and the army of ten thousand men saw the sea. One feasible location, which Brennan and Tuplin call "the current leading contender", is a hill situated roughly halfway between Pirahmet and Maçka near an ancient road. Here in 1996 Tim Mitford, who had been guided to the mountain by a local man Celal Yılmaz, observed a large circular cairn of stones, 12 metres in diameter, which may well be the platform which Xenophon describes as being assembled by the soldiers in order to set up a trophy.

Mitford's identification was supported by V. Manfredi, who, revisiting the site with Mitford a few years later, suggested that Xenophon's cairn was not the 12-metre one, but a second, 24-metre-wide round doughnut-shaped structure nearby.

However, Brennan and Tuplin argue that this is only one of several possible solutions, depending on the route which Xenophon and the army followed, and believe that the matter may never be fully resolved.

The name "Theches" is not found in any other ancient source. The hill which Mitford believes is Xenophon's is today called Deveboynu Tepe ('Camel-Neck Hill').

== Linguistics ==
Thálatta (θάλαττα, pronounced [tʰálatta]) was the Attic (i.e. Athenian) form of the word, as it appears in Xenophon's text. In most other dialects of Ancient Greek, as well as in Modern Greek, it is thálassa (θάλασσα).

== Legacy ==
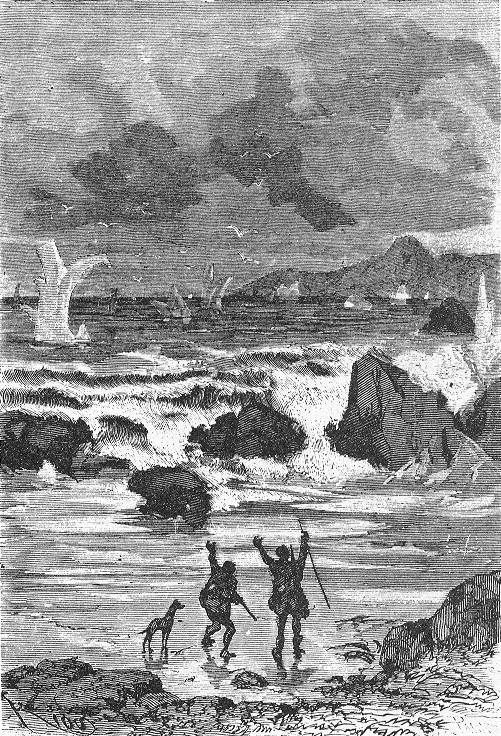
Illustration from Édouard Riou in The Adventures of Captain Hatteras.

The moving moment described by Xenophon has stirred the imagination of readers in later centuries, as chronicled in a study by Tim Rood.

Heinrich Heine uses the cry in his cycle of poems Die Nordsee published in Buch der Lieder in 1827. The first poem of the second cycle, Meergruß ('Sea Greeting'), begins:

Thalatta! Thalatta!
Sei mir gegrüßt, du ewiges Meer!
('Sea! Sea!
Be greeted by me, you eternal sea!')

The cry is used by the protagonists of Jules Verne's The Adventures of Captain Hatteras (1864-1866) when they reach the Open Polar Sea after an arduous journey and by the protagonists of Kéraban the Inflexible (1883) when they reach the Eastern shore of the Bosporus after having traveled around the perimeter of the Black Sea. The cry is also mentioned by the narrator of Frederick Amadeus Malleson's (1877) translation of Verne's Journey to the Center of the Earth, when the explorers in the story discover an underground ocean. It is absent from the original French work.

The shout briefly appears in Lionel Dunsterville's memoir The Adventures of Dunsterforce (1920), when, after passing Rasht, Dunsterville's small force reaches the Caspian Sea:

It was about an hour before sunset that the proximity of the sea was announced by the sand dunes, a moment later—Θάλασσα! θάλασσα!—the blue waters of the Caspian became visible in the distance, and we were soon in the outskirts of the Kazian settlement.

The phrase appears in Book 1 of James Joyce's 1922 novel Ulysses when Buck Mulligan, looking out over Dublin Bay, says to Stephen Dedalus:

"God! ... Isn't the sea what Algy calls it: a great sweet mother? The snotgreen sea. The scrotumtightening sea. Epi oinopa ponton. Ah, Dedalus, the Greeks! I must teach you. You must read them in the original. Thalatta! Thalatta! She is our great sweet mother. Come and look."

In Book 18, Molly Bloom echoes the phrase in the closing moments of her monologue:

"and O that awful deepdown torrent O and the sea the sea crimson sometimes like fire."

In book III.3 of Finnegans Wake this is echoed as "kolossa kolossa!" combining the original chant with Greek kolossa, colossal.

Christopher Gair sees the influence of this moment in the description in Jack Kerouac's well-known 1957 novel On the Road, when the narrator Sal Paradise sees the Pacific Ocean for the first time:

It was Sunday. A great heat wave descended: it was a beautiful day, the sun turned red at three. I started up the mountain and got to the top at four. All those lovely California cottonwoods and eucalypti brooded on all sides. ... There was the Pacific, a few more foothills away, blue and vast and with a great wall of white advancing from the legendary potato patch where Frisco fogs are born.

Sol Yurick’s 1965 novel that inspired Walter Hill's 1979 film of the same name, The Warriors, was based on Anabasis, and the movie references this quotation near the end, as the titular gang stands on a Coney Island beach and their leader (Michael Beck) comments, "When we see the ocean, we figure we're home."

Iris Murdoch wrote a novel called The Sea, The Sea, which won the Booker Prize in 1978.

== See also ==
- List of Greek phrases
