= Petekli, Sürmene =

Petekli
- District and municipality
- Location within Turkey
- Coordinates: 40°53′56″N 40°4′15″E
- Country: Turkey
- Province: Trabzon
- District: Sürmene
- Population (2021): 401
- Time zone: UTC+3 (TRT)
- Area code: 0462

Petekli is a village in the Sürmene district of the city Trabzon.

== History ==
The original name of the settlement was Makavla.In the Ottoman land registry of 1530, the settlement is recorded as a village named Makavla, belonging to the Sürmene district of that time.

== Geography ==
It is 35 km away from the Trabzon city center and 4 km away from the Sürmene district center

== Population ==
Population per year
2024	416
2023	410
2022	382
2021	401
2020	409
2019	416
2018	444
2017	396
2016	423
2015	424
2014	416
2013	397
2012	386
2011	392
2000	559
1990	897
1985	1,156
