= Ave End =

Studio album by Lacrimas Profundere
- Released: September 14, 2004
- Recorded: February - March 2004
- Genres: Gothic metal, gothic rock, doom rock
- Label: Napalm Records

Lacrimas Profundere chronology
Fall, I Will Follow (2002)	Ave End (2004)	Filthy Notes for Frozen Hearts (2006)

Professional ratings
Review scores
Source	Rating
Earshot.at	8/10
Heavymetal.dk	7/10 stars
Metallized.it	73/100
Metal.de	8/10
Stormbringer.at	4/5

Ave End is the sixth album by the German band Lacrimas Profundere. On this album, the band pursues the style previously developed on the Fall, I Will Follow album, which sounds remarkably different from their other releases, as its orientation leans more toward a modern rock sound compared to Anathema, HIM, and One Second-era Paradise Lost.

== Track listing ==
No.	Title	Length
1.	"One Hope's Evening"	3:50
2.	"Ave End"	3:46
3.	"To Bleed or Not to Be"	4:23
4.	"Sarah Lou"	4:48
5.	"Amber Girl"	2:58
6.	"Testified"	4:02
7.	"Astronautumn"	3:29
8.	"Evade"	3:55
9.	"Wake Down"	3:55
10.	"Black"	4:34
11.	"Come, Solitude"	3:41

=== Limited Edition Bonus track ===
12. "Ever"

=== Limited Edition Enhanced CD Content ===
- Ave End (Video)
