= Memo (nickname) =

Memo is a nickname, often of Guillermo. People with the nickname include:

- Memo Acevedo, Colombian-born Canadian-American jazz drummer, percussionist, composer, arranger, bandleader and educator
- Memo Benassi (1886–1957), Italian film actor
- Memo Gidley (born 1970), Mexican-American race car driver
- Guillermo Gonzalez (soccer) (born 1986), American soccer player
- Guillermo Gracida Jr. (born 1956), Mexican polo player
- Ángel Guillermo "Memo" Heredia Hernández (born 12 February 1975), Mexican former discus thrower and sports coach known for his involvement in the BALCO scandal
- Memo Luna (born 1930), Mexican baseball player
- Guillermo Ochoa (born 1985), Mexican soccer player
- Mehmet Okur (born 1979), Turkish basketball player
- Memo Rojas (born 1981), Mexican race car driver
- Guillermo Valencia (footballer), Colombian football player and coach
