= Fall, I Will Follow =

Studio album by Lacrimas Profundere
- Released: 25 February 2002
- Recorded: April–May 2001
- Genre: Gothic metal, doom metal, dark rock
- Label: Napalm Records

Lacrimas Profundere chronology
Burning: A Wish (2001)	Fall, I Will Follow (2002)	Ave End (2004)

Fall, I Will Follow is the fifth studio album by the German gothic metal band Lacrimas Profundere.

== Track listing ==
No.	Title	Length
1.	"For Bad Times"	3:52
2.	"Adorer Two"	3:34
3.	"Last"	3:43
4.	"I Did It for You"	4:14
5.	"Sear Me Pale Sun"	7:52
6.	"The Nothingship"	4:08
7.	"Liquid"	3:00
8.	"Under Your...."	3:32
9.	"....And Her Enigma"	4:27
10.	"Fornever"	7:24
