= Lacrimas Profundere =

German gothic metal band

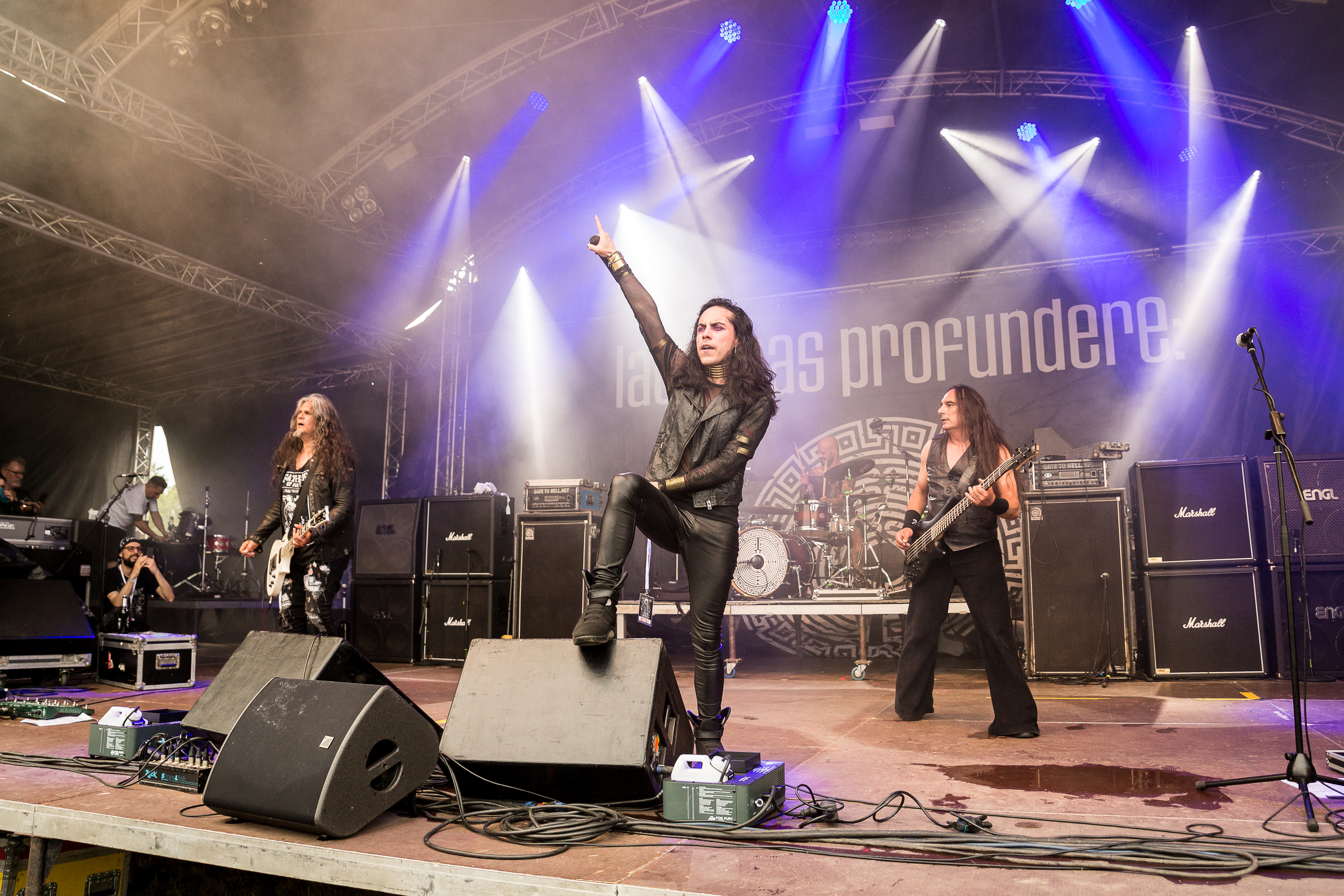
- Lacrimas Profundere at Metal Frenzy 2023

Background information
- Also known as: Rock'n'Sad Crew
- Origin: Waging am See, Germany
- Genres: Gothic metal, gothic rock, death-doom (early)
- Years active: 1993–present
- Labels: Napalm Records, Oblivion/SPV
- Members: Oliver Nikolas Schmid; Julian Larre; Dominik Scholz
- Past members: See below
- Website: lacrimas.com

Lacrimas Profundere is a German gothic metal band. Their name means "to shed tears" in Latin.

== History ==
Lacrimas Profundere was founded in 1993 by guitarist Oliver Nikolas Schmid. At the time, the band was influenced by doom metal, and also made use of feminine vocals and classical elements. With the entrance of vocalist Anja Hötzendorfer, they drew enough attention to themselves to be able to record their debut, entitled ... And the Wings Embraced Us, which was released in 1995 and was followed by La Naissance d'un Rêve (French for "The Birth of a Dream"), from 1997.

After the said releases, the band was granted a deal with Napalm Records, which included five albums. A harpist was added to the band's line-up and they proceeded to record Memorandum (1999).

Burning: A Wish from 2001 was Lacrimas Profundere's first album to receive attention from the international specialized press. This album featured the removal of the band's classical elements to some degree, and was also the first time they employed baritone vocals, supplied by Oliver's brother, Christopher Schmid. Their first international tour then began, including countries of Europe and Latin America.

Lacrimas Profundere's subsequent albums were Fall, I Will Follow from 2002 and Ave End from 2004.

Filthy Notes for Frozen Hearts received considerable attention from Jackass star Bam Margera and the songs "My Velvet Little Darkness", "Short Glance", "Should" and "Sweet Caroline" along with a vocal excerpt from "Sad Theme for a Marriage" were played on his show Bam's Unholy Union.

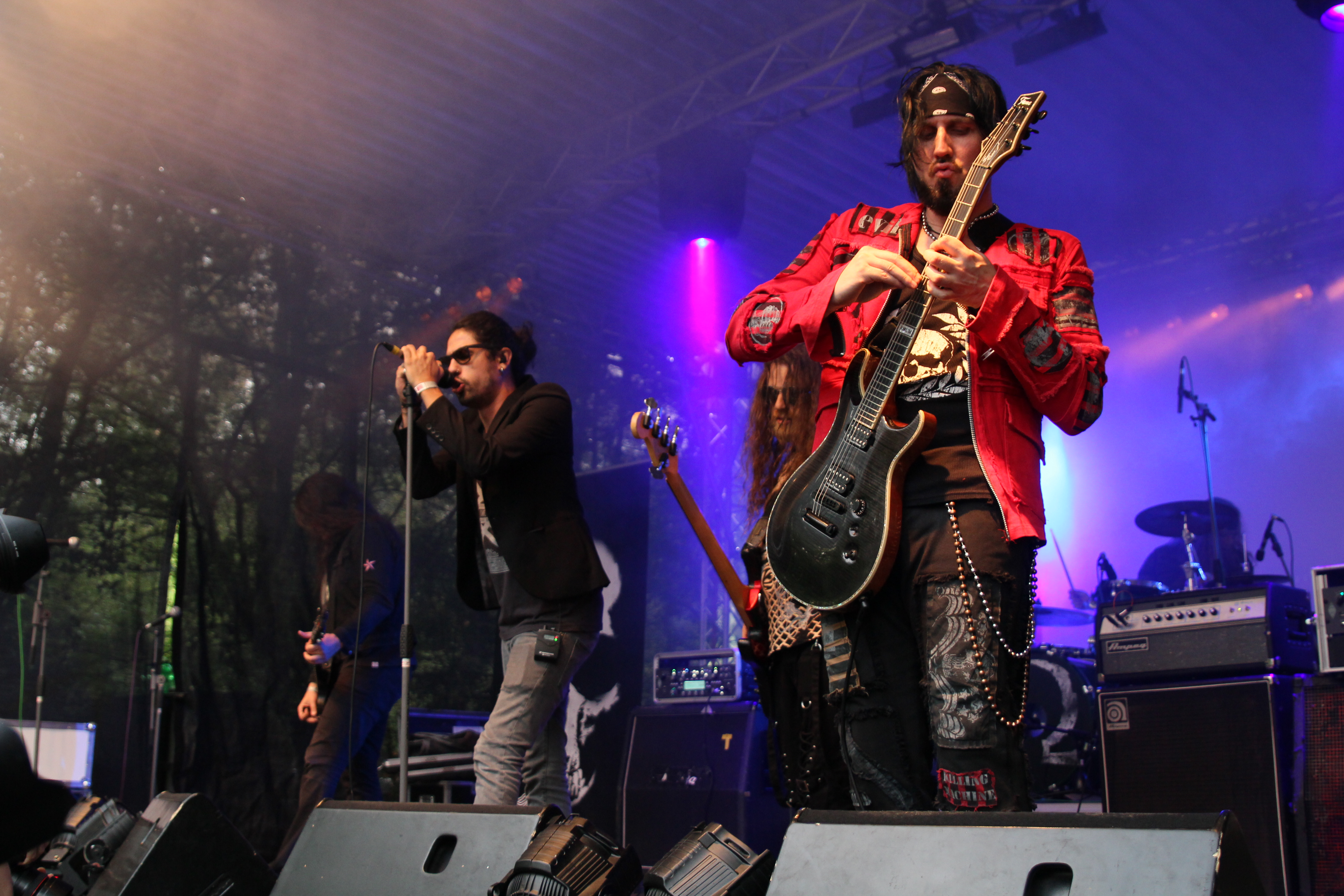
Lacrimas Profundere at Nocturnal Culture Night festival 2014

In April 2007, Christopher Schmid, the band's founding member's brother and vocalist left the band; citing prolonged stress from touring. It did not take long to find a new vocalist: Peter Kafka, who also sings for the German band Sonicslave. The former singer Christopher Schmid still takes part of the writing of the new lyrics, however, and has occasionally been seen singing for the band in concerts. A few months later bassist Daniel Lechner left the band and vocalist Peter Kafka became the new bassist. Rob Vitacca was employed as the new vocalist, who also sings for the German rock band Lost. Longtime keyboardist Christian Steiner also left the band, but supplied some parts for the new album. Songs for the Last View was released in the summer of 2008. This was the first album featuring their new singer Rob Vitacca.

Lacrimas Profundere's, The Grandiose Nowhere was released on 30 April 2010. The album spawned two singles "The Letter" and "Lips". Videos for each song were made; they also toured in places across Asia and South America.

Antiadore was released on 24 May 2013, with two music videos for "My Release in Pain" and "Antiadore", as their last album for the contract with Napalm Records.

In June 2016, Lacrimas Profundere signed with a new label, Oblivion/SPV, whom they collaborated with for the production and distribution of their eleventh studio album, Hope Is Here, which was released on 12 August 2016. With the release of said album, the band moved slightly away from their classic gothic tendencies, in lieu of a sound resembling more closely that of alternative rock. Following the release of Hope Is Here, the band toured across Germany and Austria.

In May 2018, Oliver Schmid announced through the bands' social media and on their website, that Rob Vitacca had decided to leave the band in pursuit of other musical projects, "LACRIMAS just cannot work without complete and constant dedication. And giving such a full-time commitment simply isn't possible for Rob anymore." The band took very little time to find a new vocalist, Julian Larre, who is also a founding member of the Finnish band Lessdmv.

In celebration of 25 years as a band, the band went back to the band's roots with a more gothic sound and guttural voices on Bleeding the Stars. This was the first album featuring their new vocalist, Julian Larre. It was followed by How to Shroud Yourself with Night, released in 2022. Their 14th album, Lay Me Down O Silent Fear, will be released in 2026.

== Members ==
Lacrimas Profundere live at Rockharz 2019, Germany

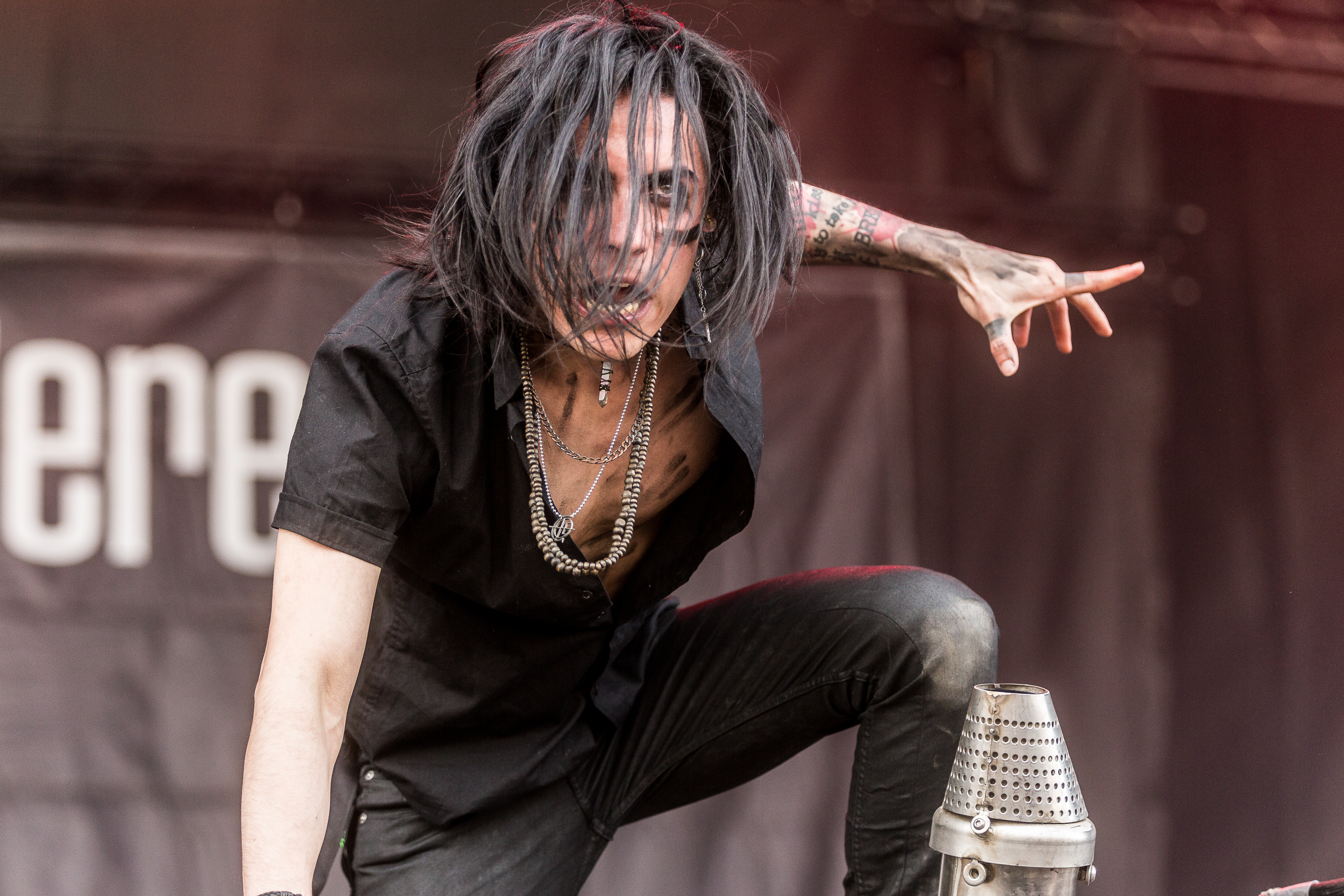
Singer Julian Larre

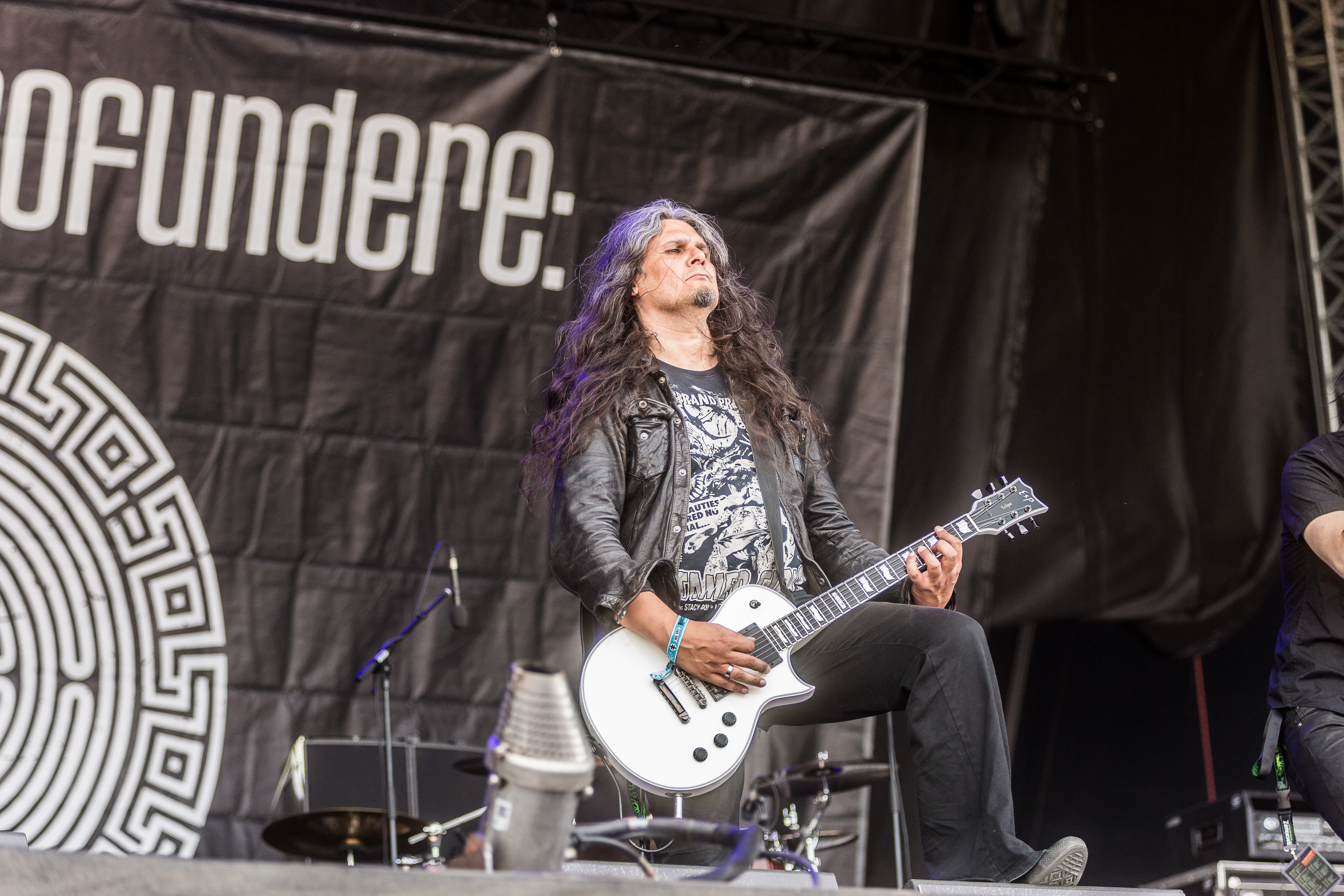
Guitarist Oliver Nikolas Schmid

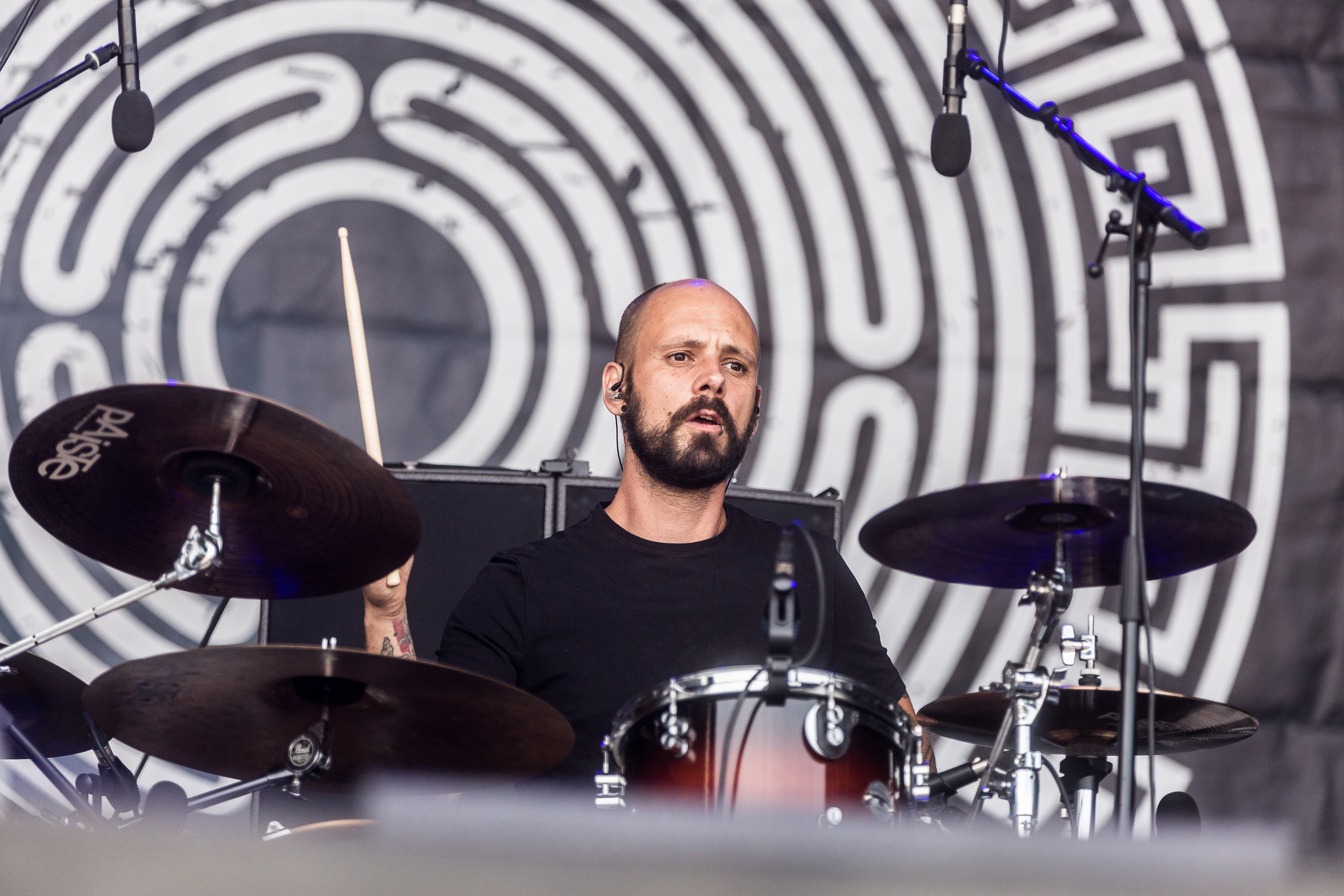
Drummer Dominik Scholz

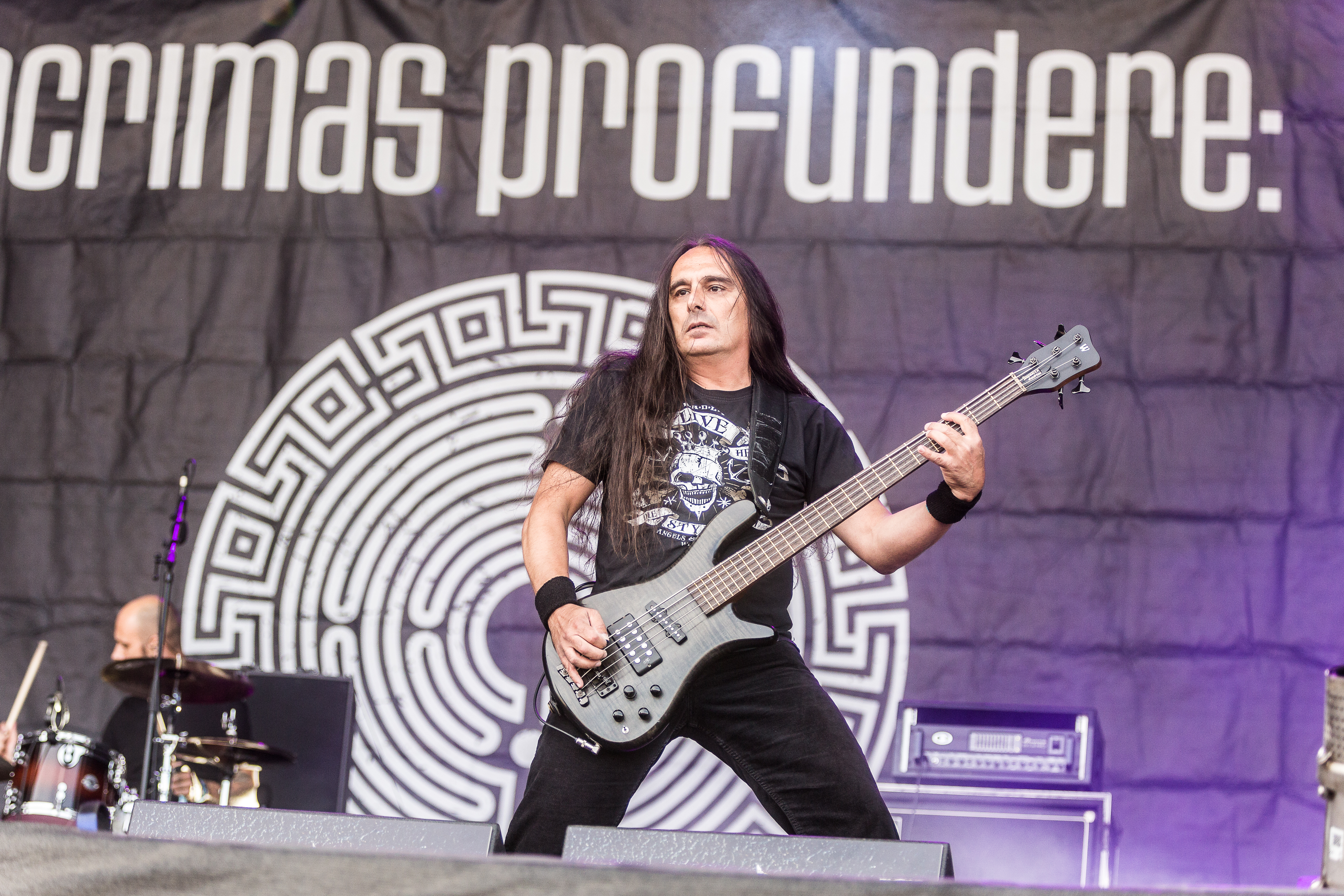
Bassist Ilker Ersin

=== Current members ===
- Julian Larre – lead vocals (2018–present)
- Oliver Nikolas Schmid – lead guitar, keyboards (1993–present)
- Dominik Scholz – drums (2010–2013, 2018–present)
- Ilker Ersin – bass (2019–present)

=== Former members ===
- Christopher Schmid – lead vocals (1993–2007)
- Markus Lapper – bass (1994–1999)
- Christian Greisberger – drums (1994–1996)
- Manuel Ehrlich – rhythm guitar (1994–1995)
- Eva Stöger – flute, keyboards (1995–1997)
- Christian Steiner – keyboards (1995–2007)
- Anja Hötzendorfer – violin, female vocals (1995–2000)
- Stefan Randelshofer – rhythm guitar (1996)
- Stefan Eireiner – drums (1997–1998)
- Marco Praschberger – rhythm guitar (1997–2002)
- Lorenz Gehmacher – drums (1998–1999)
- Ursula Schmidhammer – harp (1998–2000)
- Willi Wurm – drums (1999–2005)
- Rico Galvagno – bass (2000–2003)
- Christian Freitsmiedl – rhythm guitar (2002–2005)
- Daniel Lechner – bass (2003–2007, 2018–2019)
- Korl Fuhrmann – drums (2005–2010)
- Tony Berger – rhythm guitar (2005–2018)
- Peter Kafka – bass, backing (2007–2010), lead vocals (2007)
- Rob Vitacca – lead vocals (2007–2018)
- Clemens Schepperle – bass (2013–2018)
- Christop Schepperle – drums (2013–2018)

Timeline

== Discography ==
=== Studio albums ===
- ...And the Wings Embraced Us (1995)
- La Naissance d'un rêve (1997)
- Memorandum (1999)
- Burning: A Wish (2001)
- Fall, I Will Follow (2002)
- Ave End (2004)
- Filthy Notes for Frozen Hearts (2006)
- Songs for the Last View (2008)
- The Grandiose Nowhere (2010)
- Antiadore (2013)
- Hope Is Here (2016)
- Bleeding the Stars (2019)
- How to Shroud Yourself with Night (2022)
- Lay Me Down O Silent Fear (2026)

=== Demos ===
- The Crown of Leaving (1997)
- The Embrace and the Eclipse (1998)

=== EPs ===
- Again It's Over (2006)
- Acousticadore (2014)

=== Videos ===
- "Ave End" (2004)
- "Amber Girl" (2004)
- "Again It's Over" (2006)
- "My Velvet Little Darkness" (2006)
- "A Pearl" (2008)
- "And God's Ocean" (2009)
- "The Letter" (2010)
- "Lips" (2011)
- "My Release in Pain" (2013)
- "Antiadore" (2014)
- "Hope Is Here" (2016)
- "Father of Fate" (2019)
- "The Kingdom Solicitude" (2019)
- "I Knew and Will Forever Know" (2020)
- "Shimmering" (2024)
