= Filthy Notes for Frozen Hearts =

Studio album by Lacrimas Profundere
- Released: 29 August 2006
- Genre: Gothic metal, gothic rock
- Length: 47:21
- Label: Napalm Records
- Producer: John Fryer

Lacrimas Profundere chronology
Ave End (2004)	Filthy Notes for Frozen Hearts (2006)	Songs for the Last View (2008)

Filthy Notes for Frozen Hearts is the seventh studio album by the German gothic metal band Lacrimas Profundere. Music videos were released for the songs "Again It's Over" and "My Velvet Little Darkness". "Again It's Over" was released on its own single prior to Filthy Notes for Frozen Hearts. An acoustic version of the track "Filthy Notes" was made available for preorders from Amazon.

== Track listing ==
All songs written by Christopher Schmid and Oliver Nikolas Schmid, except where noted.

No.	Title	Length
1.	"My Velvet Little Darkness"	3:29
2.	"Again It's Over"	3:18
3.	"Not To Say"	3:11
4.	"No Dear Hearts"	3:14
5.	"Short Glance"	3:45
6.	"Filthy Notes"	3:18
7.	"Sweet Caroline"	2:59
8.	"An Irresistible Fault"	3:31
9.	"To Love Her on Knees"	2:56
10.	"Sad Theme for a Marriage"	3:33
11.	"Should"	3:36
12.	"My Mescaline"	6:13

=== Bonus limited edition digipak tracks ===
13. "Shiver"

=== Limited edition enhanced CD video content ===
- "Again It's Over" (Video) – 3:26
- "Again It's Over – Making Of" (Video) – 4:18

=== Preorder bonus track ===
- "Filthy Notes (Acoustic Version)" – 3:16

== Personnel ==
- Christopher Schmid – vocals
- Oliver Nikolas Schmid – guitar
- Tony Berger – guitar
- Christian Steiner – keyboards
- Daniel Lechner – bass
- Kori Fuhrman – drums

Production

- Produced and mixed by John Fryer
- Pre-production by Christian Steiner
- Engineered by John Fryer and Christian Steiner
- Mastered by Mika Jussila
