= Memmi =

Memmi is a surname. Notable people with the name include:

- Albert Memmi (1920–2020), French-Tunisian writer
- Lippo Memmi (c. 1291–1356), Italian painter

== See also ==
- Lussivolutopsius memmi, a species of sea snail in the family Buccinidae
- Memi (disambiguation)
- Memmo (disambiguation)
