= Sürmene =

- District and municipality
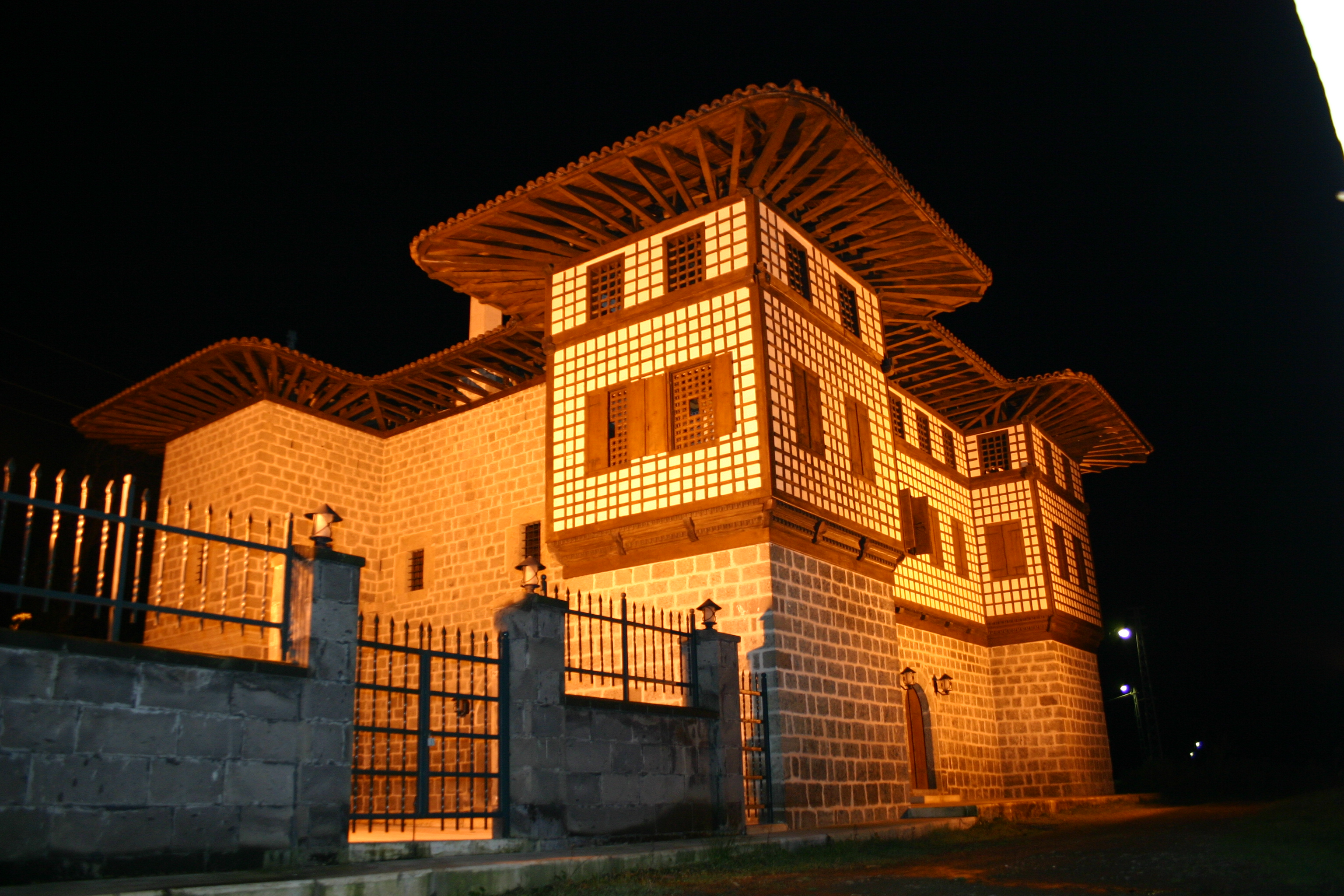
- Memiş Ağa Mansion in Sürmene

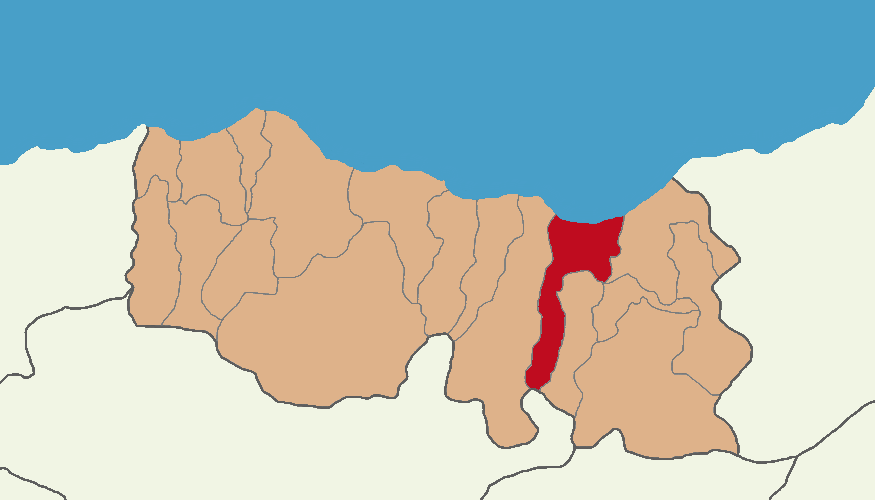
- Map showing Sürmene District in Trabzon Province

- Location within Turkey
- Coordinates: 40°54′51″N 40°06′45″E
- Country: Turkey
- Province: Trabzon

Government
  - Mayor: Hüseyin Azizoğlu (AK Parti)
- Area: 166 km^{2} (64 sq mi)
- Elevation: 20 m (66 ft)
- Population (2026): 25,281
  - Density: 152/km^{2} (394/sq mi)
- Time zone: UTC+3 (TRT)
- Postal code: 61600
- Area code: 0462
- Climate: Cfa
- Website: www.surmene.bel.tr

Sürmene (Turkish: [syɾˈmene]; Greek: Σούρμενα, Sourmena; Ottoman Turkish: ﺳﻮرﻣﻨﻪ, romanized as Sürmena[/e]) is a municipality and district of Trabzon Province, Turkey. Its area is 166 km^{2}, and its population is 25,281 (2026). In ancient times the town of Hyssus or Hyssos (Ancient Greek: Υσσός) was nearby. The mayor is Hüseyin Azizoğlu (AK Parti).

Sürmene (Humurgan) is situated some 40 km (25 mi) east of Trabzon. Known in antiquity also as Susarmia or Augustopolis, it lies on the River Kora (Manahoz Deresi) and is best known as the place where Xenophon and his Ten Thousand fell sick after eating wild honey, an event which was confirmed by the local people. In the village of Kastil, 5 km (3.1 mi) to the west of Sürmene, stands a ruined medieval castle as well as the impressively restored 18th-century Yakupoğlu Memiş Ağa Konağı mansion. This was formerly the seat of the Yakupoğlu family, who lived here as rulers (derebeys, hence its alternative name of Derebeyli Kale, the Castle of the Derebeys) of the surrounding region relatively free of interference from the Ottoman government in faraway Constantinople/Istanbul.

History

Sürmene (Gr: Surmena, Σούρμενα) is a seaside town and district situated approximately 30 km east of Trabzon. Before 1923, the number of Greeks living in the district was around 14,000. The settlements with large Greek communities were located close to the Monakos River (today Manahoz Stream). Some of the larger Greek settlements included Kelonsa (350 Greek families, 1 church), Tzita (350 Greek families, 2 churches), Assou (250 Greek families, 1 church) and Tsikoli (200 Greek families, 1 church).

The Greek settlements

Χουμουρκιάντων - Houmourkianton (the regional centre)

Ασού - Asou

Καρακαντζί - Karakantzi

Καταβόλ - Katavol

Κελόνσα - Kelonsa

Μεξεζί - Meksezi

Μουλκάντων (Χοτζαράντων) - Moulkanton (Hotzaranton)

Πετράς - Petras

Πύργη - Pirgi

Τσικολή - Tsikoli

Τσίτα - Tsita

Χαλανική - Halaniki

- This list of the Greek villages of Pontus (or villages where Greeks resided) was compiled by the Center of Asia Minor Studies (Κέντρο Μικρασιατικών Σπουδών) which is based in Greece. The list may exclude some villages which weren't known at the time the study was completed. Source: The History of Pontian Hellenism, Christos Samouilidis, Thessaloniki 1992.

== Economy ==
Historically, Sürmene produced small amounts of manganese. The area also had mineral springs, and shipped bottled water to Istanbul. Knives bearing a geographical indication and the region’s traditional flatbread, along with city and mountain tourism, are also among the region’s sources of income.

== Composition ==
There are 37 neighbourhoods in Sürmene District:

- Aksu
- Armutlu
- Aşağıovalı
- Balıklı
- Birlik
- Çamburnu
- Çamlıca
- Çarşı
- Çavuşlu
- Çiftesu
- Çimenli
- Dirlik
- Fındıcak
- Gültepe
- Güneyköy
- Kahraman
- Karacakaya
- Konak
- Koyuncular
- Küçükdere
- Muratlı
- Ormanseven
- Ortaköy
- Ortamahalle
- Oylum
- Petekli
- Soğuksu
- Üstündal
- Üzümlü
- Yazıoba
- Yemişli
- Yeniay
- Yeşilköy
- Yokuşbaşı
- Yukarıçavuşlu
- Yukarıovalı
- Zeytinli

== Flora and fauna ==
According to WWF the largest amount of endemic flora is to be found in the Ağaçbaşı yayla (summer upland pasture) in Sürmene.

- Zehirli biberiye (Andromeda polifolia),
- Böcek yiyen bitkilerden Drosera,
- Pamukotu (Eriophorum angustifolium ve E. latifolium),
- Kurtayağı (Lycopodiella inundata),
- Kara ot (Rhynchospora alba)

== Gallery ==
The Sürmeme Chamber of Commerce was the first chamber of commerce in Turkey

Sürmene Mekteb-i Rushdiye Sekbanlardan Ahmed Agha Shahadetnamesi (Diploma)

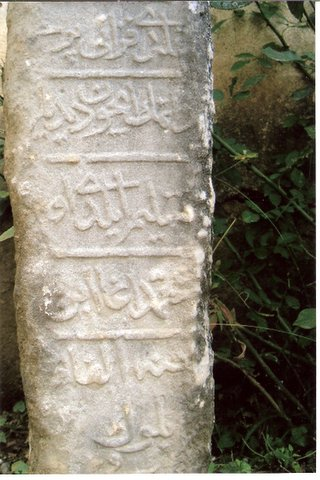
Çavuşzade Muhammed Ağa's gravestone

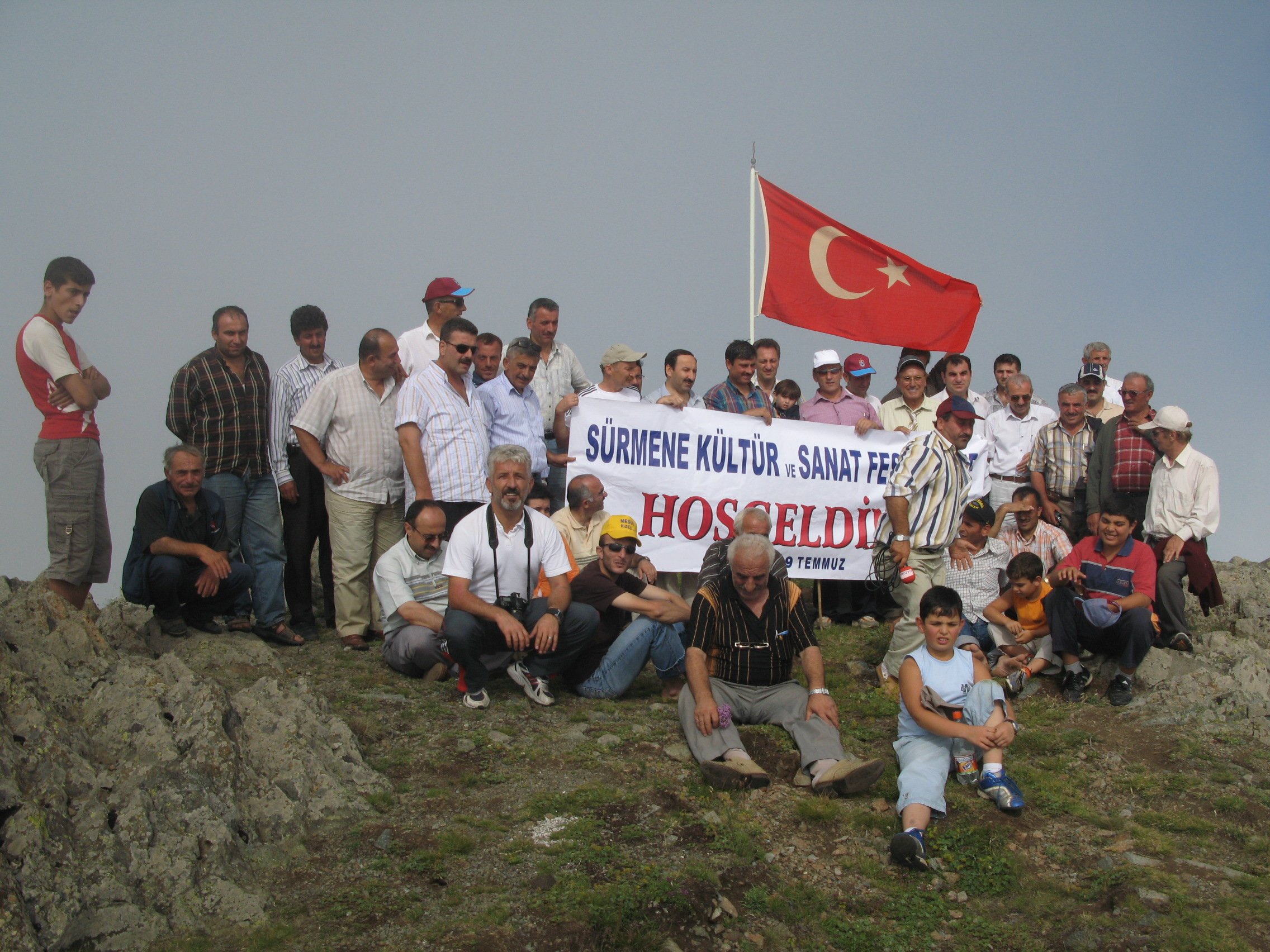
Sürmene Festival on the top of Madur mountain.

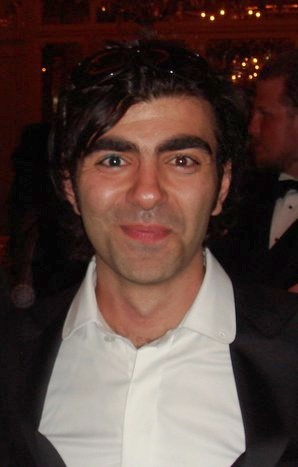
Fatih Akın Turkish film director from Çamburnu, a village of Sürmene

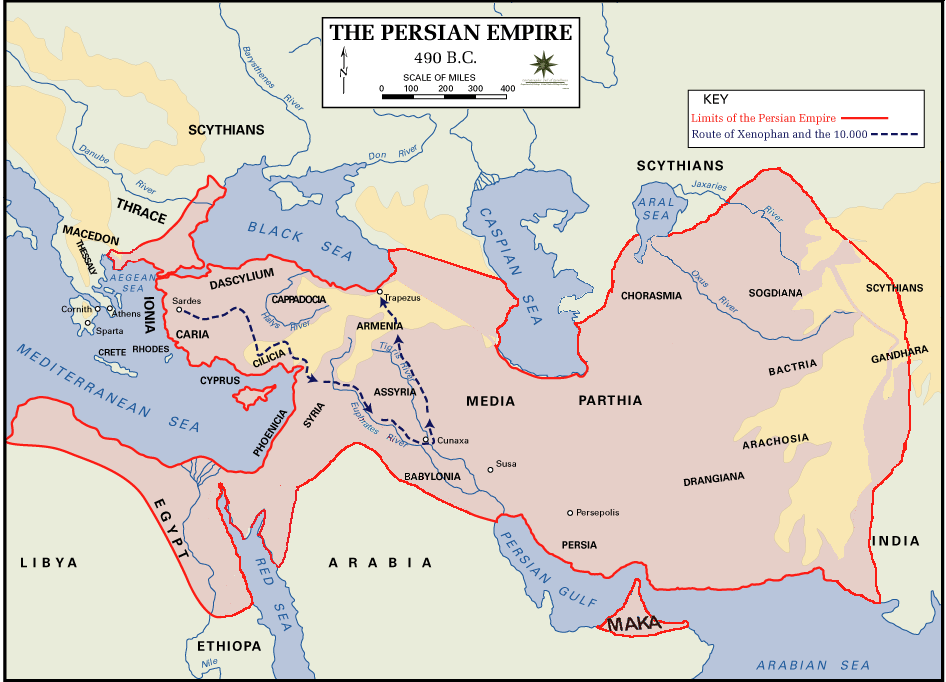
The route that brought Xenophon's Ten Thousand to Sürmene

== See also ==
- Memiş Aga Mansion
- Memiş Agha
- Madur
- Anabasis (Xenophon)
- Ten Thousand
- Sürmene knife
