= Sürmene knife =

Sürmene knife. Being 15–20 cm (5.9–7.9 in) in length, Sürmene knife has sharp or round tip and the section between incisive part and handle is embroidered by carving. Built in Sürmene at least since Byzantine times.

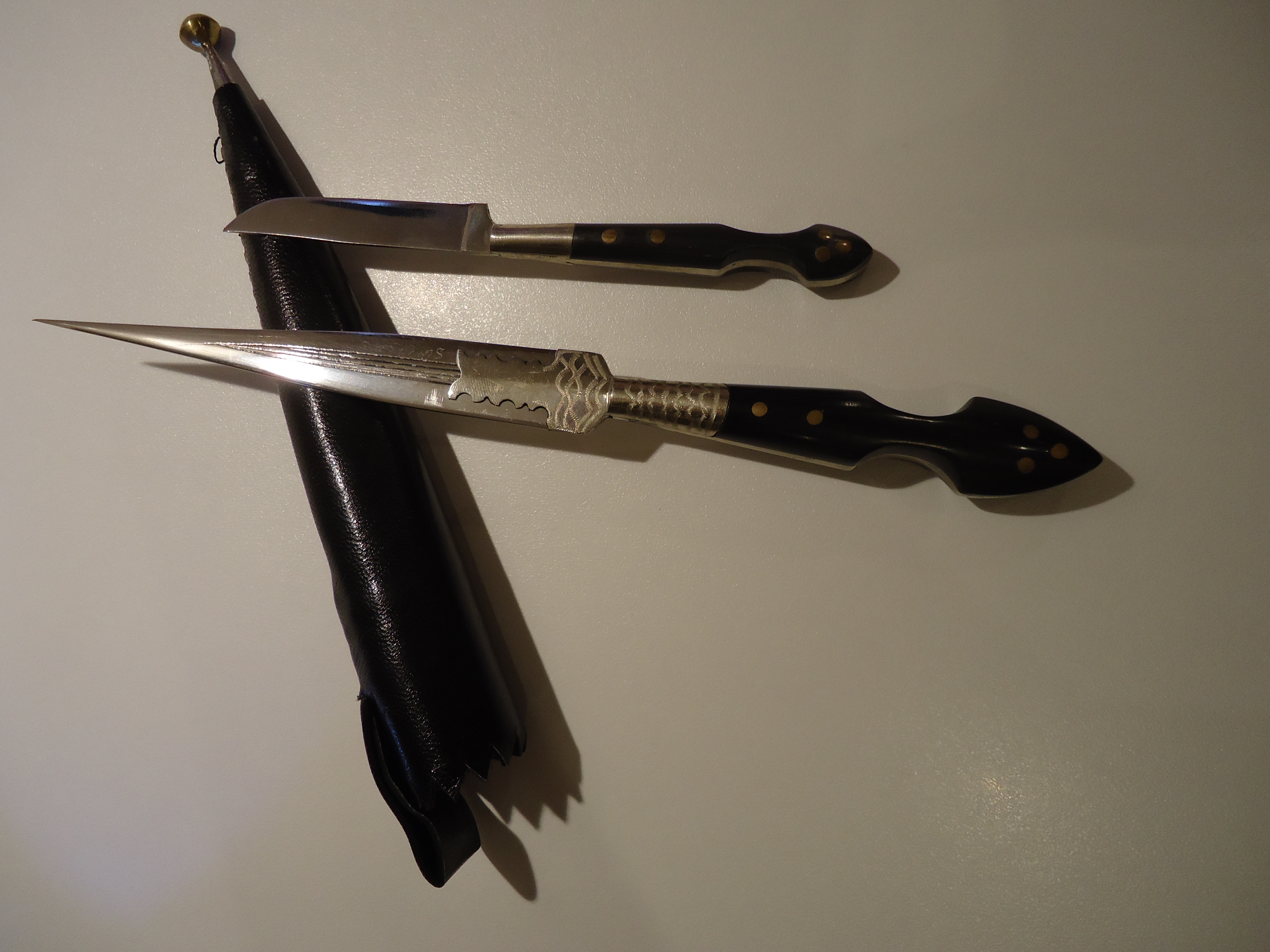
Traditional Sürmene knives. Steel body, silver ornaments, handle made from ox horn and sheath made from boxwood. Laz people and Pontians generally use it for duel fighting and knife horon (dance) since from old times. The little one is used for peeling fruits.
