= Memo =

Memo is short for memorandum, a document or other communication.

Memo or The Memo may also refer to:

== People ==
- Memo (nickname), a list of people
- Memo (footballer), Brazilian footballer Emerson Gomes de Moura (born 1988)
- Memo (rower) (born 1995), Indonesian rower

== Places ==
- Memo River, Venezuela
- Mêmo, a village in the Tibet Autonomous Region of China

== Songs ==
- "Memo", by Tonet, 1978
- "Memo", by Years & Years, 2015
- "Memo", by Young Thug from Slime Season 3, 2016
- "The Memo", by Stuart Hamm from Outbound, 2000
- "The Memo", by The Hard Lessons from Arms Forest, 2009

== MEMO ==
- Memo – Magazine of European Medical Oncology
- Middle East Monitor, a not-for-profit press monitoring organization founded in 2009
- Mouvement pour une école moderne et ouverte, an education-focused political party in Montreal, Canada
- MEMO, a specialization in electrical engineering that studies microwaves, electromagnetism and optoelectronics
- MEMO Multi-Perspective Enterprise Modelling, see Enterprise modelling

== Other uses ==
- The Memorandum (also translated as The Memo), a 1965 play by Václav Havel
- The Memo, a short film by Daheli Hall

== See also ==
- MEMO model (wind-flow simulation), a model for wind flow simulation
- Memoization, a technique used primarily to speed up computer programs
- Memorandum (disambiguation)
