= Memiş =

Memiş is a Turkish name. Notable people with the name include:

== Given name ==
- Memiş Agha, Turkish captain

== Surname ==
- Barış Memiş, Turkish footballer
- Furkan Ulaş Memiş, Turkish boxer
