= Burning: A Wish =

Studio album by Lacrimas Profundere
- Released: May 22, 2001
- Recorded: October–December 2000
- Genres: Doom metal, death/doom, gothic metal
- Label: Napalm Records

Lacrimas Profundere chronology
Memorandum (1999)	Burning: A Wish (2001)	Fall, I Will Follow (2002)

Professional ratings
Review scores
Source	Rating
Allmusic	4/5 stars

Burning: A Wish is the fourth album by the German band Lacrimas Profundere.

== Track listing ==
No.	Title	Length
1.	"Melantroduction"	3:15
2.	"Without"	3:47
3.	"Adorer and Somebody"	3:58
4.	"A Summer's End"	5:13
5.	"Solicitude, Silence"	6:03
6.	"2 Sec and a Tear"	5:12
7.	"Lastdance"	6:08
8.	"Morning...Grey"	3:12
9.	"Diotima"	4:51
10.	"Re-Silence"	3:20

== Personnel ==
- Christopher Schmid: Vocals
- Oliver Nikolas Schmid: Lead Guitars
- Marco Praschberger: Rhythm Guitars
- Rico Galvagno: Bass
- Willi Wurm: Drums
- Christian Steiner: Keyboards
