= Memo (journal) =

Peer-reviewed medical journal

memo
- Discipline: Oncology
- Language: English
- Edited by: Wolfgang Hilbe

Publication details
- History: 2008–present
- Publisher: Springer (Austria)
- Frequency: Quarterly

Standard abbreviations
- ISO 4: Memo

Indexing
- ISSN: 1865-5041 (print); 1865-5076 (web)

Links
- Journal homepage

memo - Magazine of European Medical Oncology is a peer-reviewed medical journal published by Springer and covering the fields of hematology and oncology. memo is the official journal of the Central European Cooperative Oncology Group.

memo includes editorials and comments, peer-reviewed original reports, short reviews, case reports and controversies, articles explaining the biology of neoplasia, and congress reports.

== Abstracting and indexing ==
The journal is abstracted and indexed by EMBASE, Expanded Academic, Google Scholar, and Summon by Serial Solutions.

== Central European Cooperative Oncology Group ==
The Central European Cooperative Oncology Group groups centers of clinical oncology from Central and Southeastern Europe as well as Israel that conduct of clinical trials. It also provides postgraduate education in oncology.
