= Christopher Schmid =

Vocalist

Christopher Schmid is the baritone ex-vocalist of the German gothic doom band Lacrimas Profundere. Christopher left the band on April 4, 2007, due to prolonged stress from touring with the band. He has, however, been seen at shows with the band, singing for songs such as "Without", which originally appeared on Burning: A Wish. He has also remained as the band's lyricist, and has done backing vocals, and has been renowned for his poetic, dark style, exercised in all albums, even with the dawn of their gothic rock/metal sound.
