= Madur =

Mountain in Sürmene, Turkey

Coordinates: 40°46′50″N 39°48′44″E

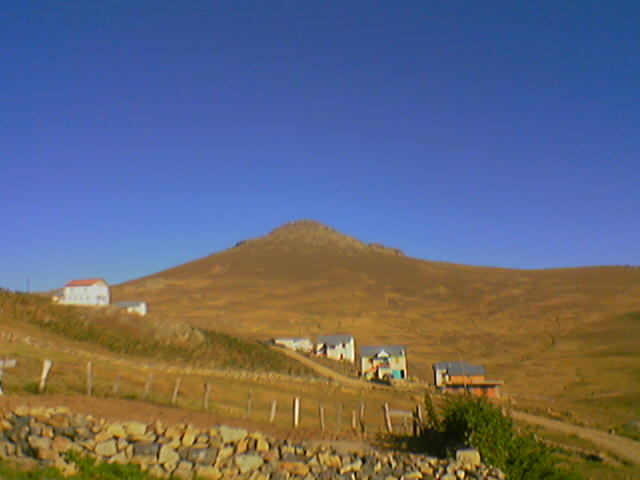

Madur, in Antiquity known as Theches (Greek: Θήχης), is a mountain in Sürmene, Turkey.

== In history ==
Thálatta! Thálatta! (Greek: Θάλαττα! θάλαττα! — "The Sea! The Sea!") was the shouting of joy when the roaming 10,000 Greeks saw Euxeinos Pontos (the Black Sea) from Mount Theches (Θήχης) in Trebizond, after participating in Cyrus the Younger's failed march against the Persian Empire in the year 401 BC. The mountain was only a five-day march away from the friendly coastal city Trapezus. The story is told by Xenophon in his Anabasis.
