= Heracleides of Maroneia =

Heracleides (Ancient Greek: Ἡρακλείδης) of Maroneia was a man of ancient Greece who lived in the 4th century BC.

He had attached himself to the service of the Thracian chief Seuthes and was residing with him at the time that Xenophon and the remains of the Ten Thousand arrived in Thrace after their memorable retreat in 300 BC. Heracleides was entrusted with the charge of disposing of the booty that had been acquired by the Greeks and Thracians in common, but kept back for his own use a considerable part of the money produced by the sale of it. This fraudulent conduct, together with the insinuations which he directed against Xenophon, when the latter urged with vigor the just claims of his troops, became the chief cause of the dissensions that arose between Seuthes and his Greek mercenaries.
