= Memiş Agha =

Turkish landowner (b. 1799 or 1804)

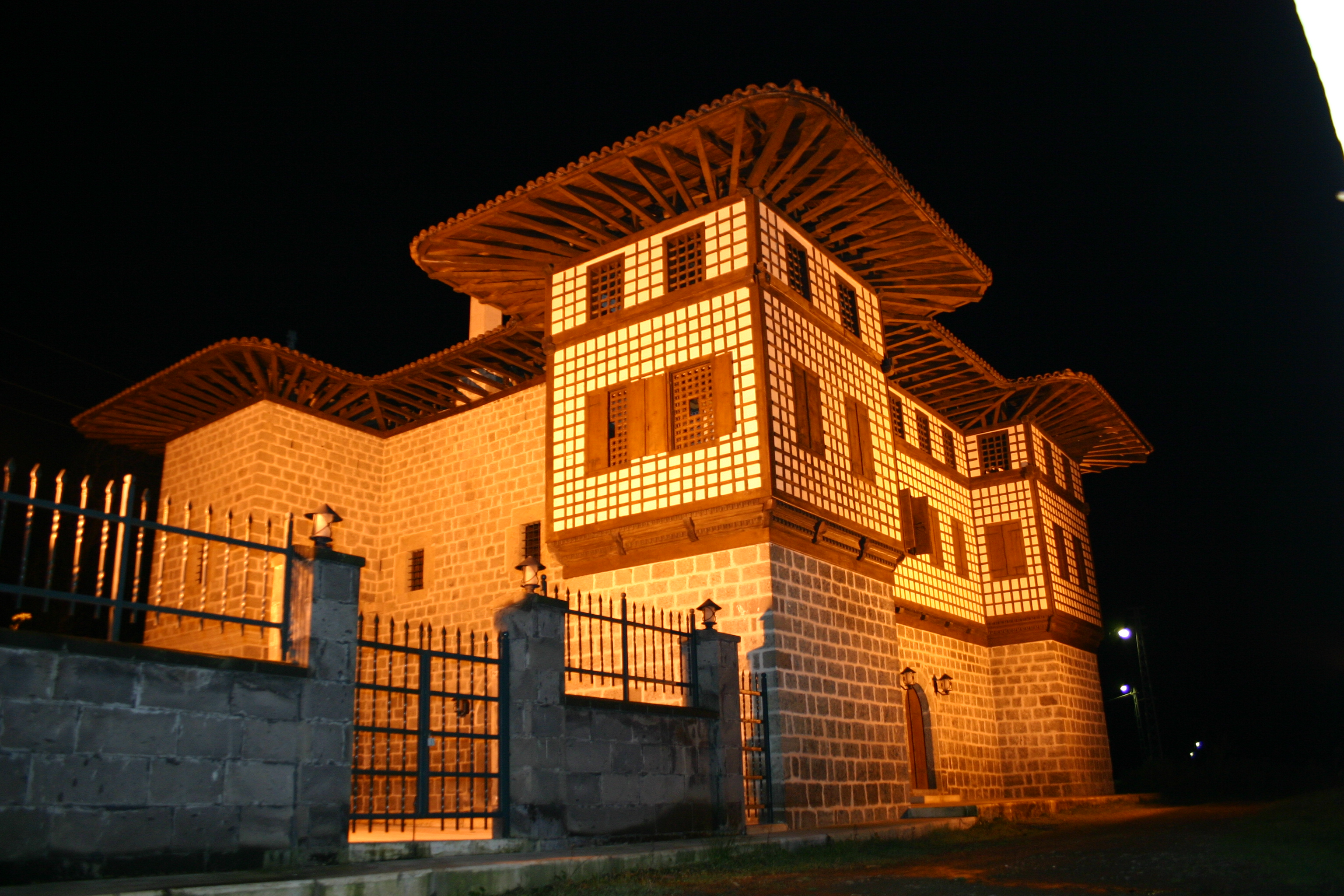
Memish Agha Mansion in Surmene

Hacı Yakupoğlu Memiş Agha (born 1799 or 1804) was a Turkish landowner.

== Early life ==
Agha was born in Balıklı village of Sürmene, Turkey, the son of Hajji Yakup Agha. His father was the region's last chief landowner.

== Migrant ==
In 1814, he was declared guilty of the harassment of the other tribe of Aghas. Yakup Agha ended up moving to Istanbul, and then later emigrated to Romania. At age 15 Memiş Agha took control of the region by resisting the Aghas who took his father. With the approval of the Ayan landowners, Memiş Agha was elevated by the Ottoman Empire in 1819.

By 1824 Ayan lands were turned over to him. In 1864 he was awarded the rank of captain, and became the representative of the military forces in the region. He was entrusted by the Ottoman Empire to catch and to deliver deserters in 1854. In 1856 Memiş Agha constructed the Memiş Agha Mansion.
