= Carleton Lewis Brownson =

American academic (1866–1948)

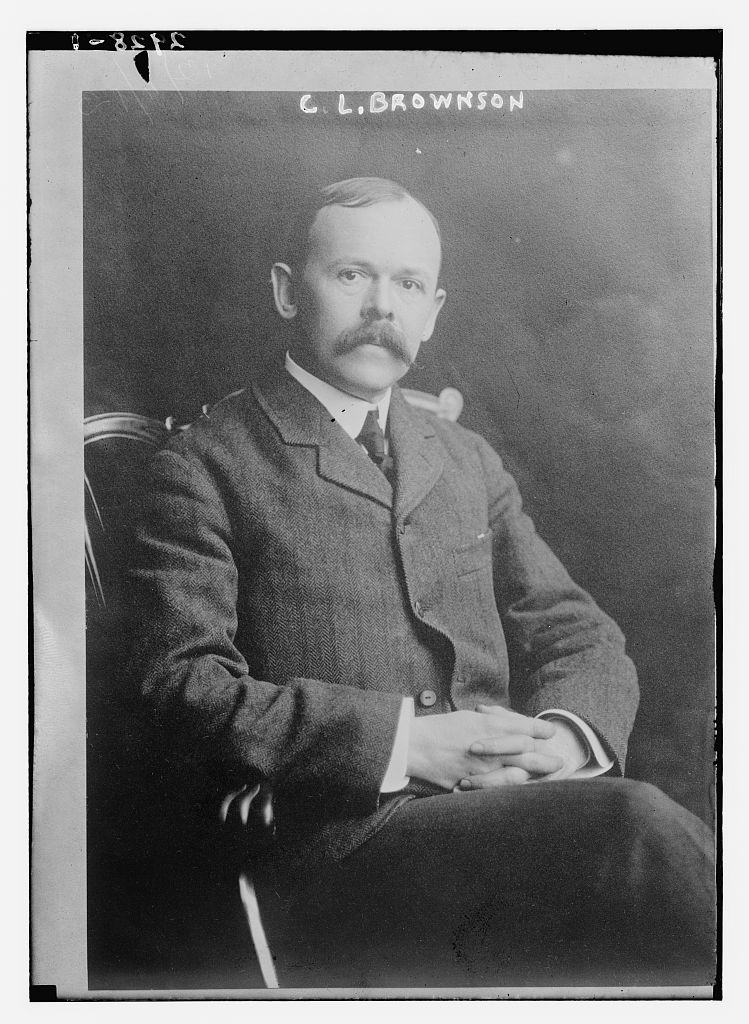

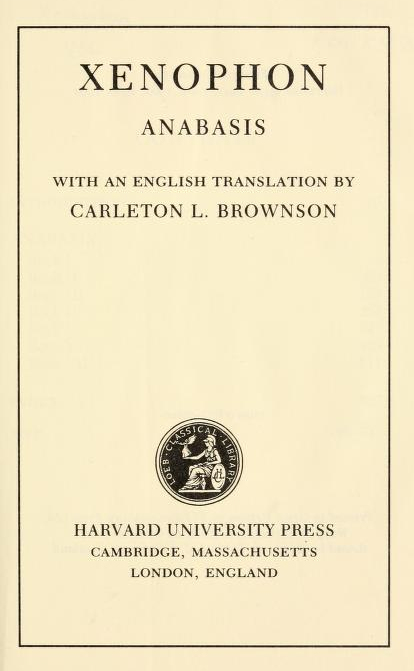
Xenophon's Anabasis, translated by Carleton Lewis Brownson

Carleton Lewis Brownson (January 19, 1866 – September 27, 1948) was a professor of the Greek language and Latin language and dean of the College of Liberal Arts at City College of New York.

== Biography ==
He was born on January 19, 1866, in Connecticut and he received an A.B. from Yale College in 1887. He traveled to Athens, Greece and became a student member at the American School of Classical Studies at Athens from 1890 to 1892. In December of 1893, he married Miss Potter according to a personal letter by Clarinda Boltwood of New Haven Ct. In 1897 he received his Ph.D. from Yale University, and was offered a teaching position at City College of New York. By 1909 he was dean of the College of Liberal Arts at City College of New York till 1926 when he was promoted to Dean of the Faculty. He died in 1948 in New York City.
