= Tim Rood =

British classical scholar

- Occupation: Classical scholar
- Awards: Hellenic Foundation Prize

Academic background
- Education: St Paul's School, London; Oriel College, Oxford (B.A., D.Phil.)
- Alma mater: University of Oxford

Academic work
- Institutions: The Queen's College, Oxford; St Hugh's College, Oxford; Faculty of Classics, University of Oxford; Radcliffe Institute for Advanced Study, Harvard University

Tim Rood is a British classical scholar, specialising in Greek historiography and reception studies. He is Professor of Greek Literature at the University of Oxford and a fellow and tutor at St Hugh's College, Oxford. His research is principally concerned with the literary techniques of Herodotus, Thucydides, and Xenophon.

== Early life and academia ==
Rood attended St Paul's School and then Oriel College, Oxford, where he gained a BA and DPhil. He shared the Hellenic Foundation Prize for his DPhil thesis in 1995 and published a revised version three years later as Thucydides: Narrative and Explanation (Oxford University Press, 1998). During that time, he held a Junior Research Fellowship at The Queen's College, Oxford. He is the author of two other books, and has published several articles on Greek historiography.

During the 2007–2008 academic year, Rood was a fellow of the Radcliffe Institute for Advanced Study, Harvard University, where his work centred primarily on Xenophon's self-presentation, description of the army as a political unit, and imaginative geography. During this time he delivered a lecture on "A Delightful Retreat: Xenophon's Scillus" to the Yale Department of Classics.

Rood has a special interest in the reception of ancient culture in the modern world. Not only does his book American Anabasis trace the influence of the classical writers in American politics, but it also draws conclusions concerning the contemporary American artist Cy Twombly, whose work is heavily influenced by antiquity. Rood presented some of his ideas on Twombly in January 2012 at the 143rd annual meeting of the American Philological Association in a talk entitled "Twombly's Narratives of Conflict: The Anabasis Series".

In March 2012, Rood was invited to deliver a lecture on the subject of "Thucydides and Homeric Scholarship" to the Department of Classics at the University of Virginia.

== Selected works ==
=== Books ===
- Rood, Tim (1998), Thucydides: Narrative and Explanation, Oxford University Press, ISBN 978-0-19-9555987, OCLC 317473119 (Joint winner of a Hellenic Foundation Prize)
- Rood, Tim (2004), The Sea! The Sea! The Shout of the Ten Thousand in the Modern Imagination, Duckworth Overlook, ISBN 978-0-71-5633083, OCLC 290681935 (Short-listed for the Runciman Award 2005)
- Rood, Tim (2010), American Anabasis: Xenophon and the Idea of America from the Mexican War to Iraq, Duckworth Overlook, ISBN 978-0-71-5636848

=== Other selected publications ===
- 'Introduction' and 'Explanatory Notes' to Robin Waterfield (trans.), 2005. Xenophon: Expedition of Cyrus. Oxford World's Classics. pp. vii-xliii, 196-224.
- 2007: 'Herodotus', 'Thucydides', 'Xenophon', and 'Polybius', in I. J. F. de Jong and R. Nünlist (eds), Time in Ancient Greek Narrative. Studies in Ancient Greek Narrative 2; Mnemosyne Supplement 291; Leiden, 115-81.
- 2007: 'The Development of the War Monograph', in J. Marincola (ed.), A Companion to Greek and Roman Historiography. Blackwell Companions to the Ancient World; Oxford, 147-58.
- 2007: 'Advice and Advisers in Xenophon's Anabasis', in D. J. Spencer and E. M. Theodorakopoulos (eds), Advice and its Rhetoric in Greece and Rome. Nottingham Classical Literature Studies 9; Bari, 47-61.
- 2007: 'From Marathon to Waterloo: Byron, Battle Monuments, and the Persian Wars', in E. Hall, P. J. Rhodes, and E. Bridges (eds), Cultural Responses to the Persian Wars. Oxford, 267-97.
- 2010: 'Xenophon's Parasangs'. The Journal of Hellenic Studies 130, 51-66.
