= Ángel Heredia =

Mexican discus thrower and sports coach

Personal information
- Born: 12 February 1975 (age 51)

Sport
- Sport: Track and field

Ángel Guillermo "Memo" Heredia Hernández (born 12 February 1975) is a Mexican former discus thrower and sports coach known for his training expertise in boxing as well as his involvement in the BALCO scandal.

== Career ==
During his discus throwing career he was largely known as Guillermo Heredia. In his first international appearance he placed seventh in the youth section of the 1990 Central American and Caribbean Junior Championships. He repeated that placing at the 1993 Pan American Junior Athletics Championships. He won his first international medal at the 1994 Central American and Caribbean Junior Championships, securing the junior discus title and also coming eight in the shot put. Later that year he represented Mexico at the 1994 World Junior Championships in Athletics, but was eliminated in the qualifying round.

Heredia struggled to break into the sport at a senior level and began doping with human growth hormone and testosterone. He won four discus titles at the Mexican Athletics Championships from 1995 to 1999, but failed to achieve his dream of performing at the Summer Olympics. He expanded his knowledge of using performance-enhancing drugs and found that this was highly valued by other athletes looking to dope. Following in his father's background as a chemistry professor, Heredia earned a science degree which led him to deeply explore the chemical functions of various drugs and devise methods which both reduced the chances of detection in drug tests and made efficient use of their athletically enhancing effects.

As an athletics coach and chemist he was largely known as Ángel Heredia and gained the nickname "Memo". He worked with a number of prominent track and field coaches including Trevor Graham, Winthrop Graham, John Smith and Ray Stewart. He created a number of doping substances and methods, with a combination of testosterone, growth hormone and EPO being his most successful. Following revelations of widespread doping, stemming from the BALCO scandal, Heredia discussed his methods and doping in general with international media. He was called as a witness by the Federal Bureau of Investigation and the United States Anti-Doping Agency several times from 2008 to 2011.

Following this period he began referring to himself professionally as Ángel Hernández and began working as a strength and conditioning coach. He works with legal training boosting methods, such as very specific training routines, altitude training, and legal nutritional supplements. He began to work with boxers Juan Manuel Márquez and Jorge Arce in 2011, helping both to world titles.
