= Memorandum (album) =

Studio album by Lacrimas Profundere
- Released: December 1999
- Recorded: April – May 1999
- Genre: Doom metal, death/doom, gothic metal
- Label: Napalm Records

Lacrimas Profundere chronology
La Naissance d'un Rêve (1998)	Memorandum (1999)	Burning: A Wish (2001)

Memorandum is the third album by the German band Lacrimas Profundere.

== Track listing ==
No.	Title	Length
1.	"Infinity"	3:45
2.	"Helplessness"	6:24
3.	"...And How to Drown in Your Arms"	3:20
4.	"Black Swans"	4:24
5.	"Reminiscence"	5:53
6.	"The Crown of Leaving"	6:39
7.	"All Your Radiance..."	5:22
8.	"The Embrace and the Eclipse"	5:56
9.	"The Fate of Equilibrium"	1:58

== Personnel ==
Christopher Schmid: Vocals
Anja Hotzendorfer: Violin and Female Vocals
Oliver Nikolas Schmid: Lead-, classic and acoustic guitar
Marco Praschberger: Rhythm guitars
Markus Lapper: Bass
Ursula Schmidhammer: Harp
Christian Steiner: Keyboards
Lorenz Gehmacher: Drums
