= Ancient Greek military personal equipment =

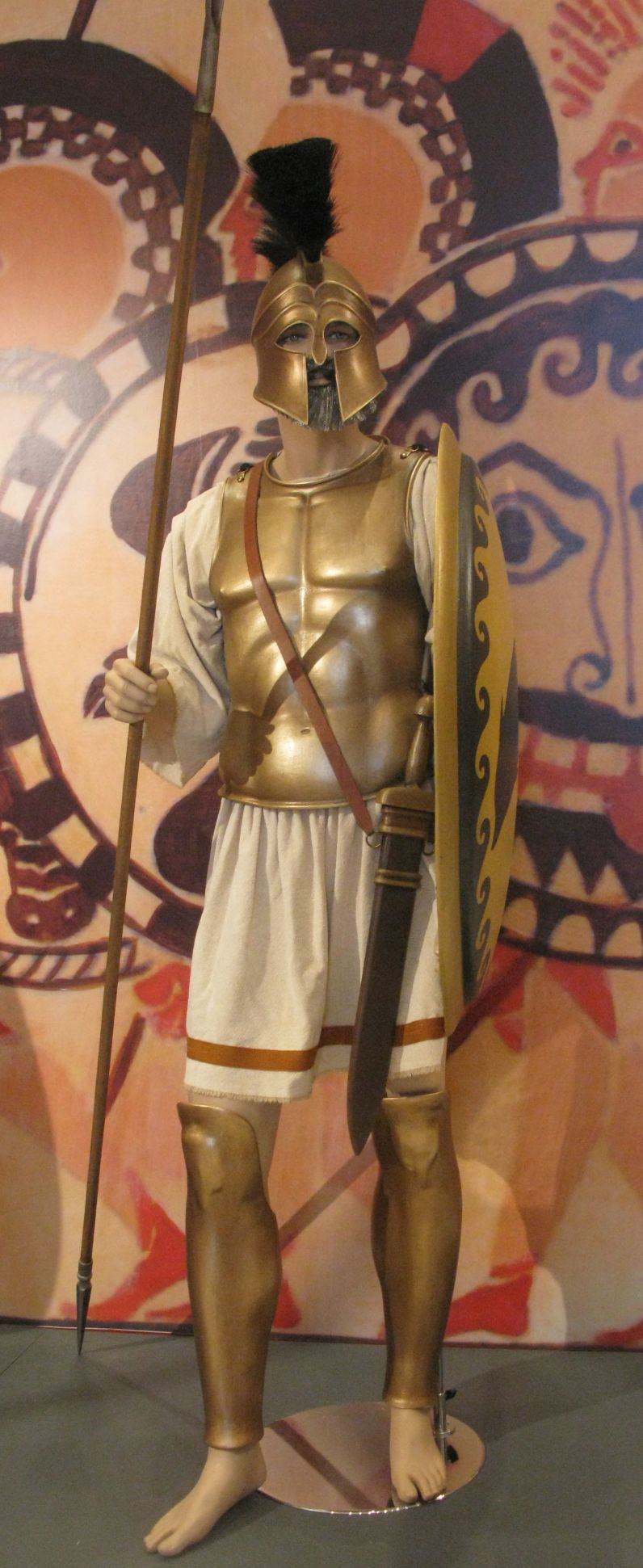
A Greek hoplite with muscle cuirass, spear, shield, Corinthian helmet and sheathed sword.

Ancient Greek weapons and armor were primarily geared towards combat between individuals. Their primary technique was called the phalanx, a formation consisting of massed shield wall, which required heavy frontal armor and medium-ranged weapons such as spears. Soldiers were required to provide their own panoply, which could prove expensive, however the lack of any official peace-keeping force meant that most Greek citizens carried weapons as a matter of course for self-defence. Because individuals provided their own equipment, there was considerable diversity in arms and armor among the Hellenistic troops.

The poorest citizens, unable to afford the purchase or upkeep of military equipment, operated on the battlefield as psiloi or peltasts; fast, mobile skirmishing troops.

Weapons that used copper were becoming obsolete at the time. This is because copper was very weak compared to iron and bronze weapons. Iron was plentiful back then and allowed smaller nations in Greece to arm themselves with weapons that were lighter and stronger than copper. Bronze was still used but rare because of how hard it was to find tin, and therefore the weapons of ancient Greece were made of iron and copper. This would help them in the Greco-Persian Wars.

== Personal Equipment ==
=== Spear ===
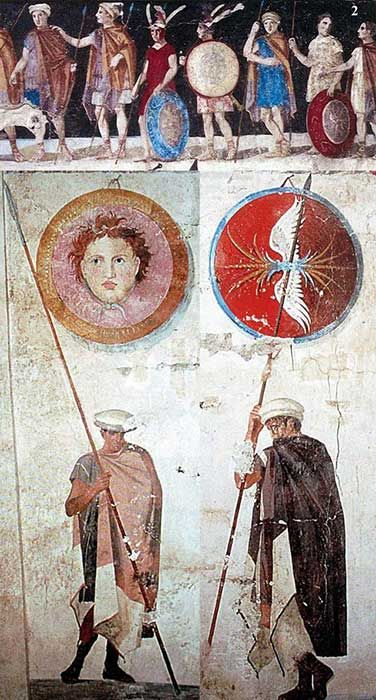
Paintings of Ancient Macedonian soldiers, arms, and armaments, from the tomb of Agios Athanasios, Thessaloniki in Greece, 4th century BC

The primary weapon that was used by Greek troops was a two-to-three meter spear with a leaf-shaped blade at one end and a short spike at the other known as the doru. The spearhead was usually made of bronze or iron but which one was more prominently used is still an open question. The short spike was known as the sauroter, or 'lizard killer', and is presumed to have served mainly to finish off wounded opponents on the ground, as the phalanx advanced, or as a spearhead if the main spear was broken. The Doru was used one-handed (the other hand supporting the soldier's shield). Mounted cavalry were known to have used a thinner spear or very long lance (xyston) which provided a range advantage over shorter infantry spears.

Under Philip II of Macedon, hoplites were equipped with extremely long spears (up to 21 feet) called sarrisae. Used in conjunction with the phalanx formation, this made an impregnable wall of spears in front of the infantry; the enemy's shorter weaponry could not reach the phalanx because of the sarissa.

=== Sword ===
As a secondary weapon, hoplites are known to have carried a short sword known as the xiphos which was made from iron or bronze depending on the era. This was used in the event of a broken spear, or if close melee combat was necessary. Hoplites mounted on horseback likely used a heavier, curved sword known as the kopis, meaning "chopper" in the Greek language. Light infantry known as peltasts would carry a number of javelins used to pepper enemy formations, avoiding close combat whenever possible. The job of the peltast was not to engage in formation combat, therefore, many carried nothing more than javelins.

=== Ranged weapons ===
Hand-to-hand, light support troops such as the psiloi were often armed with ranged weapons. Popular ranged weapons were the bow (toxοtai), javelin (akontia) and sling (sfendonai). While the bow was a relatively uncommon weapon (the wooden stave bow used had a limited range), some troops treated their arrows by thrusting them into rotting corpses, thus creating a crude form of biological weapon. Peltast troops commonly used javelins, and hoplites and cavalry troops were also often equipped with javelins for throwing. The javelins used were light spears around 1.5 meters in length, with a bronze head to facilitate recovery of the weapon; they were usually thrown with the aid of an amentum. Slings used both lead pellets and stones; stones were also commonly thrown by hand.

== Armor ==
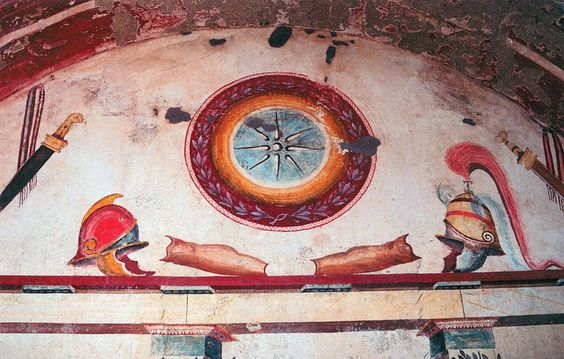
Ancient Macedonian paintings of Hellenistic-era military armor, arms, and gear from the Tomb of Lyson and Kallikles in ancient Mieza (modern-day Lefkadia), Imathia, Central Macedonia, Greece, dated 2nd century BC.

Linothorax armor made out of linen fabric was the most common form of infantry torso armor, being cheap and relatively light. Bronze breastplate armor was also used, in forms such as a bell cuirass. Little other armor was worn, and fatal blows to unprotected areas (such as the bladder or neck) are recorded in ancient art and poetry. Cavalry armor was designed to be lightweight; over a sleeveless tunic called a chitoniskos the cavalry soldier would wear a muscle cuirass designed to leave the arms as free as possible. Hoplites wore greaves to protect the lower leg, as did cavalry, but otherwise the torso and head were the only body parts protected by armor.

== Shields ==
The most vital part of the panoply was the aspis, a large, round shield commonly made from a layer of bronze, wood, and leather. The aspis was around a meter in diameter, and weighed around 7.3 kg (16 lbs), making it uncomfortable to hold for long periods. Peltasts were armed with wicker shields called pelte, which were much lighter, allowing for greater movement on the battlefield. These were designed to defend against in-coming javelins from opposing peltasts, not necessarily to fend off the thrust of a spear or sword.

== Helmets ==
Helmets for the infantry came in various types. The earliest standard hoplite helmet was the Corinthian helmet, developed around 600BC. Later, this was replaced by the Phrygian helmet and Chalcidian helmet, which were lighter and did not impair the wearer's vision or hearing so severely. Helmets often had a horsehair crest, for decorative purposes and as an additional level of protection. The Boeotian helmet was commonly used by cavalry troops due to their need for unimpeded vision and hearing. Helmets were mainly used for protecting the head but leaving the eyes, mouth and nose unprotected.

== See also ==
- Acinaces
- Makhaira
- Ancient Greek warfare
- Ancient Greek mercenaries
- Military tactics in Ancient Greece
