= Ancient Greek warfare =

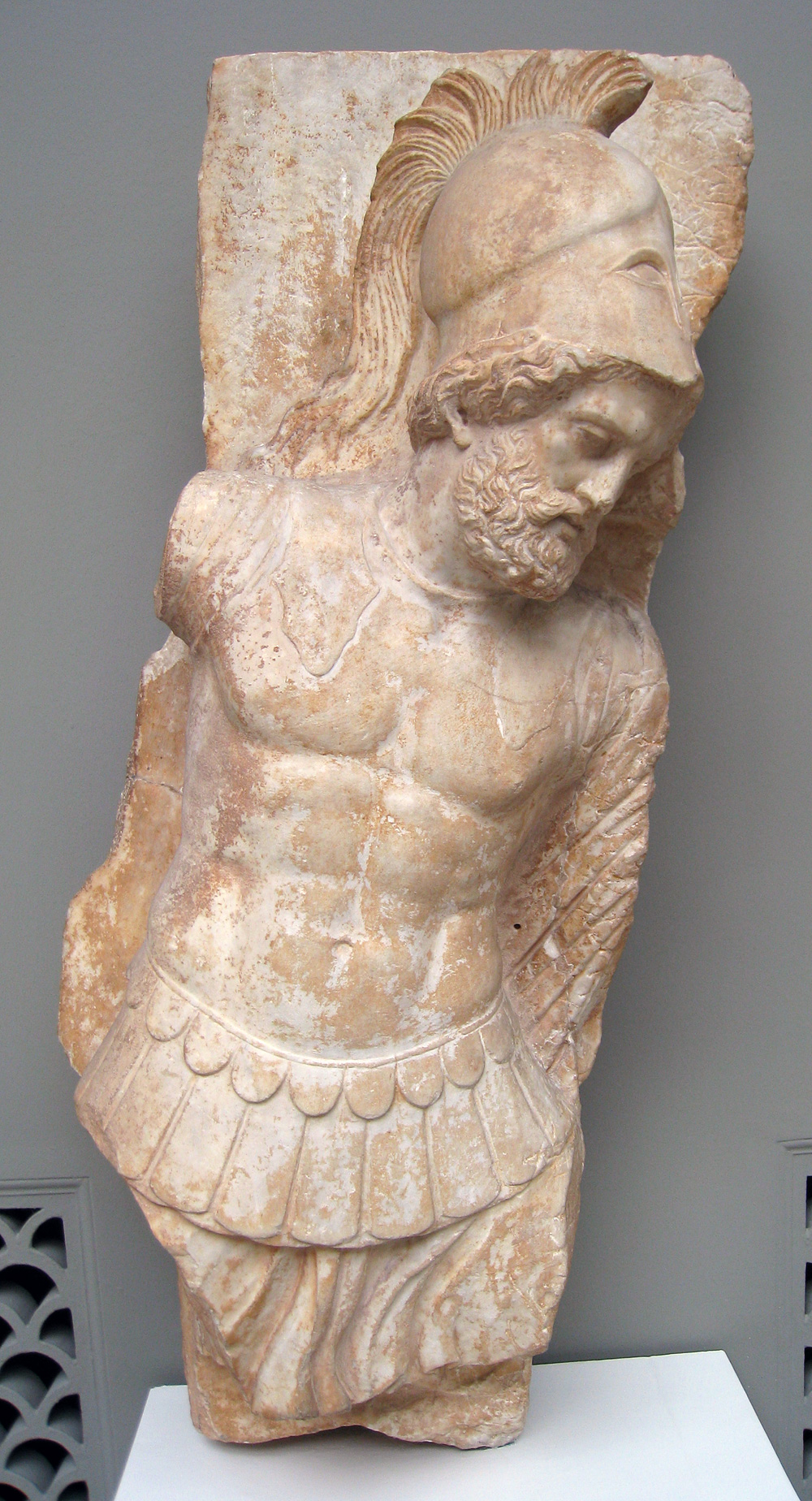
Ancient Greek marble relief (c. 330 BC) depicting a soldier in combat, holding his weapon in his hand as he prepares to strike a fallen enemy; the relief may have been part of an official Athenian state memorial; from the Ny Carlsberg Glyptotek collection, Copenhagen, Denmark

Warfare occurred throughout the history of Ancient Greece, from the Greek Dark Ages onward. The Greek Dark Ages drew to an end as a significant increase in population allowed urbanized culture to be restored, which led to the rise of the city-states (poleis). These developments ushered in the period of Archaic Greece (800–480 BC). They also restored the capability of organized warfare between these poleis (as opposed to small-scale raids to acquire livestock and grain, for example). The fractious nature of Ancient Greek society seems to have made continuous conflict on this larger scale inevitable.

Along with the rise of the city-state evolved a new style of warfare: the hoplite phalanx. Hoplites were armored infantrymen, armed with spears and shields. Seen in media, the phalanx was a formation of these soldiers with their shields locked together and spears pointed forward. The Chigi vase, dated to around 650 BC, is the earliest depiction of a hoplite in full battle array. With this evolution in warfare, battles seem to have consisted mostly of the clash of hoplite phalanxes from the city-states in conflict. Since the soldiers were citizens with other occupations, warfare was limited in distance, season and scale. Neither side could afford heavy casualties or sustained campaigns, so conflicts seem to have been resolved by a single set-piece battle.

The scope and scale of warfare in Ancient Greece changed as a result of the Greco-Persian Wars, which marked the beginning of Classical Greece (480–323 BC). To battle the enormous armies of the Achaemenid Empire was effectively beyond the capabilities of a single city-state. The eventual triumph of the Greeks was achieved by alliances of many city-states, on a scale and scope never seen before.

The rise of the naval power of Athens in competition with the dominant land power of Sparta after this conflict led directly to the Peloponnesian War, which saw diversification of warfare. Emphasis shifted to naval battles and strategies of attrition such as blockades and sieges. Following the defeat of the Athenians in 404 BC, and the disbandment of the Athenian-dominated Delian League, Ancient Greece fell under the Spartan hegemony. But this was unstable, and the Persian Empire sponsored a rebellion by the combined powers of Athens, Thebes, Corinth and Argos, resulting in the Corinthian War (395–387 BC). Persia switched sides, which ended the war, in return for the cities of Ionia and Spartan non-interference in Asia Minor.

The Spartan hegemony would last another 16 years, until, at the Battle of Leuctra (371 BC) the Spartans were decisively defeated by the Theban general Epaminondas. The Thebans acted with alacrity to establish a hegemony of their own over Greece. However, Thebes lacked sufficient manpower and resources, and became overstretched. Following the death of Epaminondas and loss of manpower at the Battle of Mantinea, the Theban hegemony ceased. The losses in the ten years of the Theban hegemony left all the Greek city-states weakened and divided. The city-states of southern Greece were now too weak to resist the rise of the Macedonian kingdom under Philip II. With revolutionary tactics and a reformed Macedonian army, Philip II of Macedon brought most of Greece under his sway, paving the way for the conquest of "the known world" by his son Alexander the Great. The rise of the Macedon marked the end of the distinctive hoplite battle.

== Military structure and methods ==
=== Hoplite ===
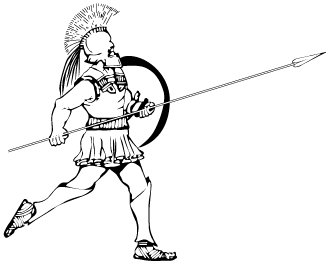
A hoplite armed with an aspis and a doru. It is usually agreed that the doru could not be used two-handed with the aspis.

Along with the rise of the city-state evolved a brand new style of warfare and the emergence of the hoplite. The hoplite was an infantryman, the central element of warfare in Ancient Greece. The word hoplite (Greek ὁπλίτης, hoplitēs) derives from hoplon (ὅπλον, plural hopla, ὅπλα) meaning the arms carried by a hoplite. Hoplites were the citizen-soldiers of the Ancient Greek city-states (except Spartans who were professional soldiers). They were primarily armed as spearmen and fought in a phalanx (see below).

Hoplite armor was extremely expensive for the average citizen, so it was commonly passed down from the soldier's father or relative. Alexander's Macedonian army had spears called sarissas that were 5 1/2 metres (18 feet) long, far longer than the 2–3 m (6–9 ft) Greek dory. The secondary weapon of a hoplite was the xiphos, a short sword used when the soldier's spear was broken or lost while fighting.

The origins of the hoplite are obscure, and no small matter of contention amongst historians. Traditionally, this has been dated to the 8th century BC, and attributed to Sparta; but more recent views suggest a later date, towards the 7th century BC. Certainly, by approximately 650 BC, as dated by the Chigi vase, the "hoplite revolution" was complete. The major innovation in the development of the hoplite seems to have been the characteristic circular shield (aspis), roughly 1 m (3 ft) in diameter, and made of wood faced with bronze. Although comparatively heavy, the design of this shield was such that it could be supported on the shoulder. More importantly, it permitted the formation of a shield-wall by an army, an impenetrable mass of men and shields. Men were also equipped with metal greaves and also a breastplate made of bronze, leather, or stiff cloth. When this was combined with the primary weapon of the hoplite, the 2–3 m (6–9 ft) long spear (the doru), it gave both offensive and defensive capabilities.

Regardless of where it developed, the model for the hoplite army evidently quickly spread throughout Greece. The persuasive qualities of the phalanx were probably its relative simplicity (allowing its use by a citizen militia), low fatality rate (important for small city-states), and relatively low cost (enough for each hoplite to provide his own equipment). The phalanx also became a source of political influence because men had to provide their own equipment to be a part of the army.

==== The hoplite phalanx ====
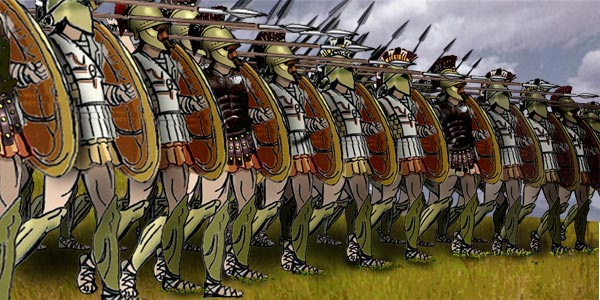
Reconstruction of a Hoplite Phalanx formation

The ancient Greek city-states developed a military formation called the phalanx, which were rows of shoulder-to-shoulder hoplites. The hoplites would lock their shields together, and the first few ranks of soldiers would project their spears out over the first rank of shields. The phalanx therefore presented a shield wall and a mass of spear points to the enemy, making frontal assaults much more difficult. It also allowed a higher proportion of the soldiers to be actively engaged in combat at a given time (rather than just those in the front rank).

The phalanx formed the core of ancient Greek militaries. Because hoplites were all protected by their own shield and others' shields and spears, they were relatively safe as long as the formation didn't break. When advancing towards an enemy, the phalanx would break into a run that was sufficient to create momentum but not too much as to lose cohesion. The opposing sides would collide viciously, possibly terrifying many of the hoplites of the front row. The battle would then rely on the valour of the men in the front line, while those in the rear maintained forward pressure on the front ranks with their shields. When in combat, the whole formation would consistently press forward trying to break the enemy formation; thus, when two phalanx formations engaged, the struggle essentially became a pushing match, in which, as a rule, the deeper phalanx would almost always win, with few recorded exceptions.

When exactly the phalanx was developed is uncertain, but it is thought to have been developed by the Argives in their early clashes with the Spartans. The Chigi vase, dated to around 650 BC, is the earliest depiction of a hoplite in full battle array. The hoplite was a well-armed and armored citizen-soldier primarily drawn from the middle classes. Every man had to serve at least two years in the army. Fighting in the tight phalanx formation maximised the effectiveness of his armor, large shield and long spear, presenting a wall of armor and spear points to the enemy.

=== Hoplite warfare ===
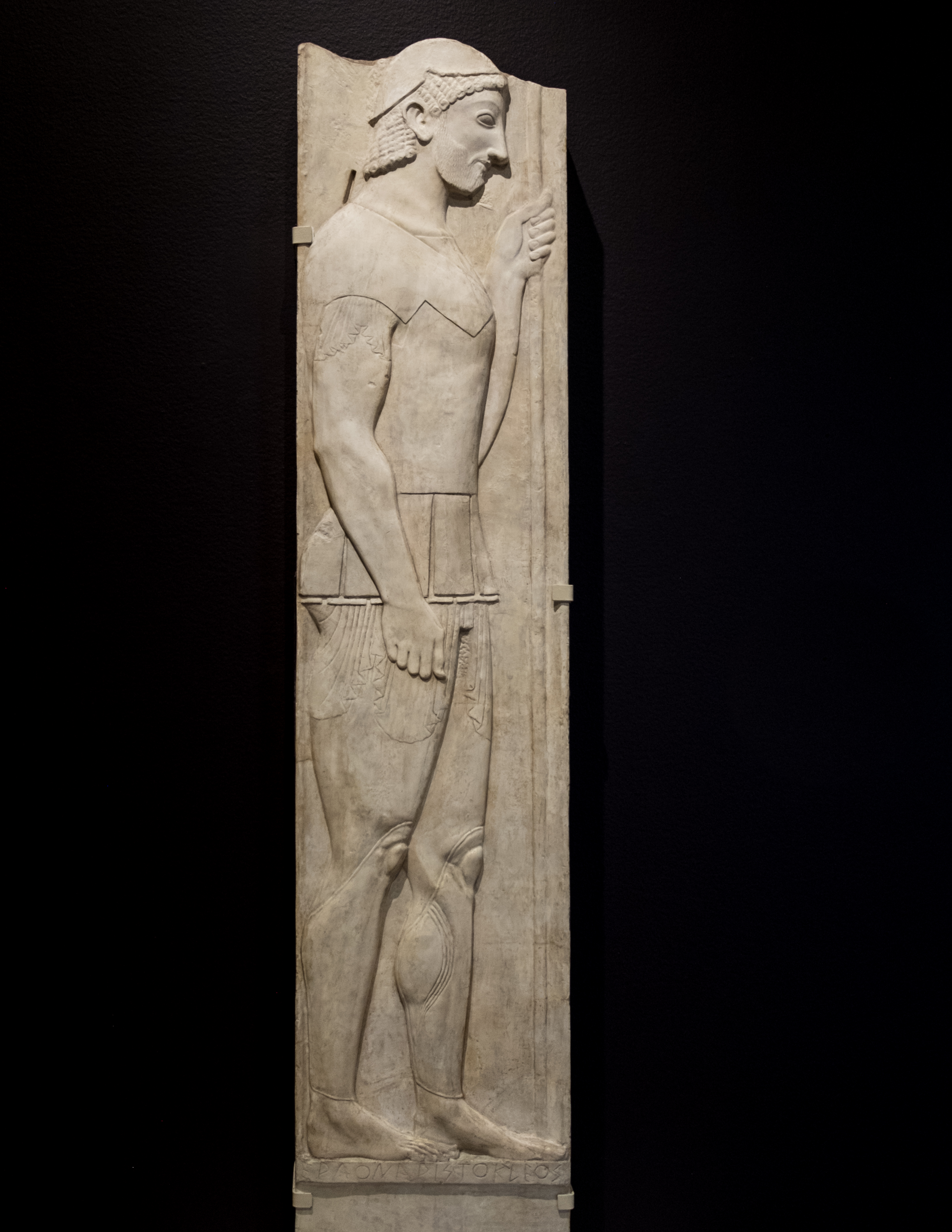
Stele of Aristion, heavy-infantryman or hoplite. 510 BC. Top of helmet and pointed beard missing.

At least in the Archaic Period, the fragmentary nature of Ancient Greece, with many competing city-states, increased the frequency of conflict, but conversely limited the scale of warfare. Unable to maintain professional armies, the city-states relied on their citizens to fight. This inevitably reduced the potential duration of campaigns, as citizens would need to return to their jobs (especially in the case of farmers). Campaigns would therefore often be restricted to summer. Armies marched directly to their target, possibly agreed on by the protagonists. Sparta was an exception to this rule, as every Spartiate was a professional soldier. Spartans instead relied on slaves called helots for civilian jobs such as farming.

If battle was refused by one side, it would retreat to the city, in which case the attackers generally had to content themselves with ravaging the countryside around, since the campaign season was too limited to attempt a siege. When battles occurred, they were usually set-piece and intended to be decisive. These battles were short, bloody, and brutal, and thus required a high degree of discipline. At least in the early classical period, hoplites were the primary force; light troops and cavalry generally protected the flanks and performed skirmishing, acting as support troops for the core heavy infantry.

The strength of hoplites was shock combat. The two phalanxes would smash into each other in hopes of quickly breaking the enemy force's line. Failing that, a battle degenerated into a pushing match, with the men in the rear trying to force the front lines through those of the enemy. This maneuver was known as the othismos or "push". Thucydides described hoplite warfare as othismos aspidon or "the push of shields". Battles rarely lasted more than an hour. Once one of the lines broke, the troops would generally flee from the field, chased by peltasts or light cavalry if available. If a hoplite escaped, he would sometimes be forced to drop his cumbersome aspis, thereby disgracing himself to his friends and family. Casualties were slight compared to later battles, amounting to anywhere between 5% and 15% for the winning and losing sides respectively, but the slain often included the most prominent citizens and generals who led from the front. Thus, the whole war could be decided by a single field battle; victory was enforced by ransoming the dead back to the defeated, called the "Custom of the Dead Greeks"..

=== Other elements of Greek armies ===
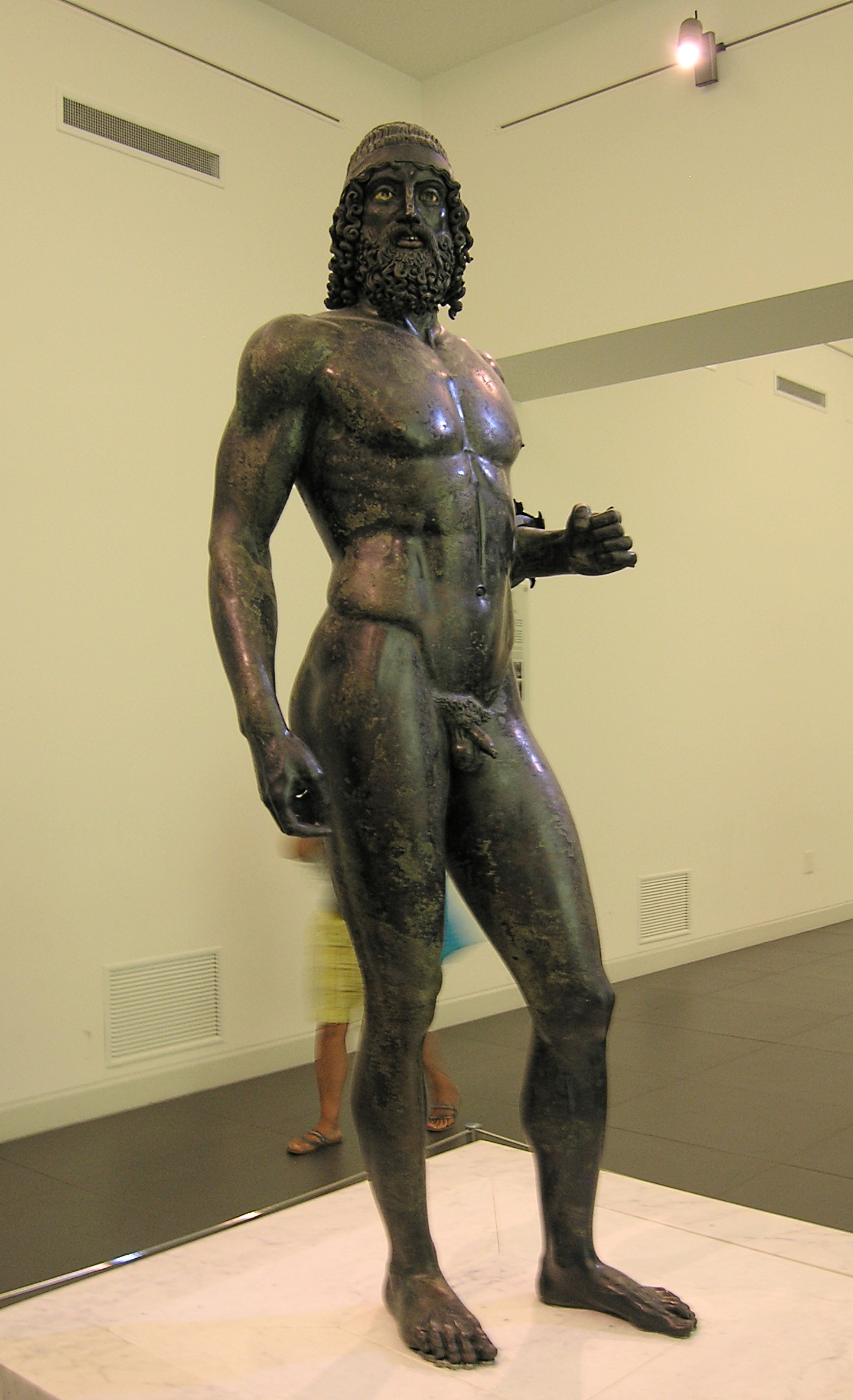
An Ancient Greek warrior, Riace bronzes, c. 450 BC

Greek armies also included significant numbers of light infantry, the psiloi, as support troops for the heavy hoplites, who also doubled as baggage handlers for the heavy foot. These included javelin throwers (akontistai), stone throwers (lithoboloi and petroboloi) and slingers (sphendonitai) while archers (toxotai) were rare, mainly from Crete, or mercenary non-Greek tribes (as at the crucial Battle of Plataea (479 BC)). Greek armies gradually downgraded the armor of the hoplites (to linen padded thorax and open helmets) to make the phalanx more flexible and upgraded the javelineers to lightly-armored general-purpose infantry (thorakitai and thyreophoroi) with javelins and sometimes spears. Eventually, these types effectively complemented the Macedonian‐style phalanx which prevailed throughout Greece after Alexander the Great.

Cavalry had always existed in Greek armies of the classical era but the cost of horses made it far more expensive than hoplite armor, limiting cavalrymen to nobles and the very wealthy (social class of hippeis). During the early hoplite era cavalry played almost no role whatsoever, mainly for social, but also tactical reasons, since the middle-class phalanx completely dominated the battlefield. Gradually, and especially during the Peloponnesian War, cavalry became more important acquiring every role that cavalry could play, except perhaps frontal attack. It scouted, screened, harassed, outflanked and pursued with the most telling moment being the use of Syracusan horse to harass and eventually destroy the retreating Athenian army of the disastrous Sicilian expedition 415-413 BC. One of the most famous troop of Greek cavalry was the Tarantine cavalry, originating from the city-state of Taras in Magna Graecia.

Though ancient Greek historians made little mention of mercenaries, archeological evidence suggests that troops defending Himera were not strictly Greek in ancestry. Though the victory at Himera is widely seen as a defining event for Greek identity, analysis of the DNA of 54 corpses found in graves unearthed in Himera's west necropolis traced professional soldiers to regions near modern Ukraine, Latvia, and Bulgaria.

== Agricultural and economic impact ==
Campaigns were often timed with the agricultural season to impact the enemy's or enemies' crops and harvest. The timing had to be carefully arranged so that the invaders' enemy's harvest would be disrupted, but the invaders' harvest would not be affected. Late invasions were also possible in the hopes that the sowing season would be affected, but this, at best, would have minimal effects on the harvest.

One alternative to disrupting the harvest was to ravage the countryside by uprooting trees, burning houses and crops, and killing all who were not safe behind the walls of the city. Uprooting trees was especially effective given the Greek reliance on the olive crop and the long time it takes new olive trees to reach maturity. Ravaging the countryside took much effort and depended on the season because green crops do not burn as well as those nearer to harvest.

War also led to the acquisition of land and enslaved people, which would lead to a greater harvest that could support a larger army. Plunder was also a large part of the war, and this allowed for pressure to be taken off of the government finances and allowed for investments to be made that would strengthen the polis. War also stimulated production because of the sudden demand for weapons and armor. Shipbuilders would also experience sudden increases in their production demands.

== Naval tactics ==
=== Battle formations ===
In open sea, the Greek navy would sail in an upside-down ship formation, led by the commander's ship. However, at first sight of enemy ships, the Greek navy would turn to starboard or port to form its line for battle. The battle line consisted of ships lined up side by side, facing the enemy. This abreast formation acted as both an offensive and defensive tactic. Offensively, it allowed the ancient ships' main weapon, the ram, to be easily accessible. With the entire fleet alongside each other, there were more rams available to attack the opponent. This formation also provided the Greek fleet with protection by shielding the most vulnerable parts of the ships, which were the sides and the stern.

The abreast formation was used in almost all of the naval battles, except during the Battle of Naupactus. During this battle, the Athenian navy was attacked before it could transition into its battle formation. This battle formation was also so successful for the Greek navy that their opponents began to utilize it as well. In order to continue being successful, the Greek navy had to create new tactics and technology to be able to conquer its opponents.

=== Diekplous ===
The diekplous was an ancient Greek naval operation used to infiltrate the enemy's line-of-battle. The maneuver consisted of Greek ships, in line abreast, rowing through gaps between its enemy's ships. After the galley successfully crossed the opponent's line, the Greek ships would turn around and attack the susceptible side of the opponent's vessel.

Although the diekplous is considered to be one of the most effective maneuvers in naval warfare, it was only successfully used in three battles: Lade, Chios, and Side. One reason why the tactic became less useful was that enemies quickly developed defensive tactics against it. One way opponents countered the diekplous was by retreating their fleet into a tight circle with the prows of their ships facing outward. This defensive maneuver was known as the hedgehog counter-formation. The tight circle prevented the Greek navy from infiltrating its opponent's squadron because if the navy used the diekplous, the galley would be encircled by its enemy and rammed. This counter formation was used by Themistocles in the Battle of Artemisium.

=== Periplous ===
Another naval tactic used by the ancient Greeks was the periplous. The periplous consisted of the Greek navy "sailing around" the enemy's line. Like the diekplous, the periplous' purpose was to expose the enemy's stern for an easy ramming target. An example of this tactic is described by Thucydides during the second battle between the Athenians and Peloponnesians in the Gulf of Corinth. During this engagement, a single Athenian galley was being pursued by a Peloponnesian ship until the Athenian ship circled around a merchant ship and rammed the Peloponnesian vessel and sank it. The Athenian ship was successful in this maneuver because it was the faster of the two ships, which is a key element in the periplous.

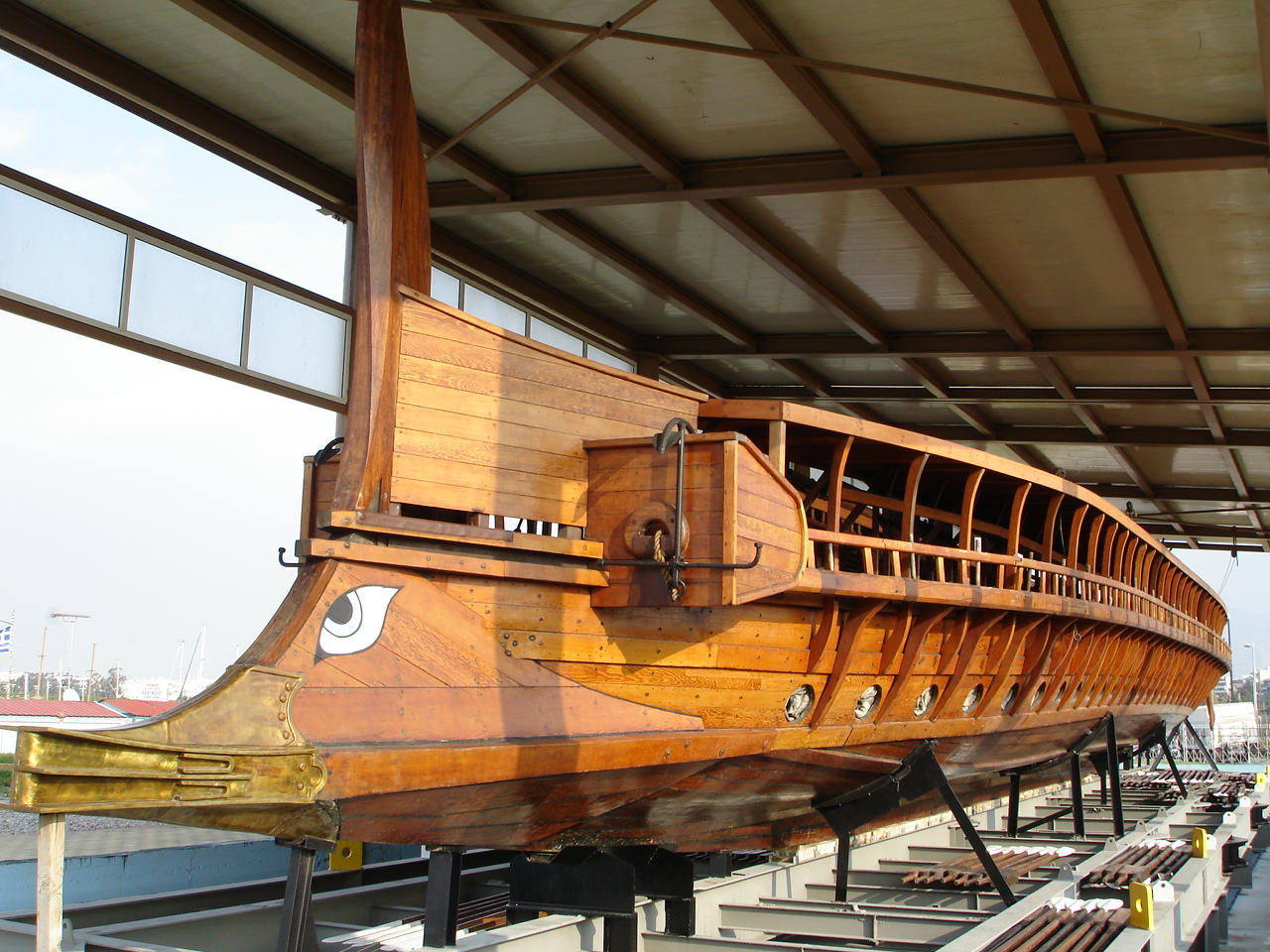
Olympias, a reconstruction of an ancient Athenian trireme, with bronze bow ram

=== Ramming ===
The ram on the trireme was the Greek navy's most successful weapon. A trireme was equipped with a large piece of timber sheathed in an envelope of bronze, located in the front of the ship. Although each ship had a ram, the ship needed to have a skilled crew to be successful with this tactic. The oarsman rowing the ship needed to accurately hit the target, and then be able to quickly dislodge the weapon before the enemy ship sank. The usual target during this attack was the stern, where the steering oars were located, or the side of the ship where the rowing oars were. While the ramming itself may have caused only a few casualties to the enemy, the majority of the casualties occurred later as the vessel began to sink, forcing its crew into the water.

=== Shearing ===
During an attack using the ram, the crew also sheared the enemy. Shearing occurred when the oars of one ship collided with any part of the opposing ship. During the collision, the wooden paddles shattered and often skewered the rower and the men surrounding him. In addition to maiming, if not immediately killing, the enemy, the attacker was given another advantage to ram the opponent. This opportunity occurred while the attacked vessel stopped rowing to evaluate the strength of each side of oarsman, leaving it in a standstill. The temporarily inoperative ship would become victim to more ramming and spearing attacks.

=== Marines and archers ===
Marines, or epibatai, were the secondary weapon for the Greek navy after the ram. During battles, marines were responsible for both attacking the enemy's ship, and preventing their own ship from being boarded. The number of marines on the trireme fluctuated based on each battle. For example, during the Peloponnesian War, there were 4 archers and 10 marines on the deck of a vessel. However, Cimon had forty marines aboard each ship during the battle of Eurymedon. The difference in numbers between these two battles is because commanders used the marines for different purposes based on the circumstance of the battles. If the battle was being fought in confined waters, there would be more marines on the trireme. The ships would require more marines because the constricted water would prevent the use of typical tactics, and would increase the risk of the ship being boarded by the enemy.

Archers were also important in naval battles. The arrows of the seagoing archers were deadly and efficient and could decrease the enemy's fighting power considerably by picking off officers and men on the enemy ship. The arrows had an effective range of 160–170 meters. When fired from a ship executing a diekplous or a ramming blow, the arrows had a greater velocity.

== Land tactics ==
=== Hoplites ===
Soldiers of the Greek army were called hoplites. They were known for their courage and strength. Stories like the Battle of Thermopylae demonstrate the strength and skill Greeks had in land battle. From the moment Greeks started fighting with "bronze shields and in the phalanx," they must have regularly been drawn up in rank and file and not just crowded together. They had a specific formation in order to execute all of their military maneuvers. The Athenian army was typically divided into ten taxeis, or tribal regiments, and subdivided into lochoi. These subunits worked as smaller pieces of an overall picture of military power. Trained thoroughly, the hoplites were as skilled at their melee combat as the Athenian oarsmen were at their precision ramming and rowing.

=== Phalanx ===
The phalanx was an army tactic the Greeks performed with shields. Each soldier carried a shield in his left arm, which he used to protect both himself and the man on his left. The depth of the phalanx differed depending on the battle and commander, but the width of the formation was considerably greater than its depth. For example, during the battle of Syracuse, the depth of the Athenian army's phalanx was 8 men, while its opponent, the Syracusan army, had a depth of 16 men.

=== Melee ===
Melee, or hand-to-hand combat, occurred most often after the tight formation of the phalanx dispersed. This fighting was also often referred to as dorarismos, meaning "spear-fighting" because the hoplites would use small swords in the fighting. One example of melee combat is described by Herodotus during a battle at Thermopylae. Herodotus reports that after the Spartans had lost their spears and swords during the dorarismos, they continued fighting "with their hands and teeth."

=== Ambuscade ===
An uncommon tactic of Ancient Greek warfare, during the hoplite battles, was the use of ambush. When light-armed forces began to be used, ambushing became a recognized scheme. The most known version of this tactic occurred during the Battle of Dyme in 218 BC, when one side pretended to retreat from the fighting and enticed their enemy to follow them into an ambush. This tactic became so well known that in 217 BC the Stratian army declined to pursue the Akarnanians during their retreat in fear that they would face an ambush.

== Military campaigns ==
=== The Greco-Persian Wars ===
The scale and scope of warfare in Ancient Greece changed dramatically as a result of the Greco-Persian Wars. To fight the enormous armies of the Achaemenid Empire was effectively beyond the capabilities of a single city-state. The eventual triumph of the Greeks was achieved by alliances of many city-states (the exact composition changing over time), allowing the pooling of resources and division of labour. Although alliances between city states occurred before this time, nothing on this scale had been seen before.

The Greco-Persian Wars (499–448 BC) were the result of attempts by the Persian Emperor Darius the Great, and then his successor Xerxes I to subjugate Ancient Greece. Darius was already ruler of the cities of Ionia, and the wars are taken to start when they rebelled in 499 BC. The revolt was crushed by 494 BC, but Darius resolved to bring mainland Greece under his dominion. Many city-states made their submission to him, but others did not, notably including Athens and Sparta. Darius thus sent his commanders Datis and Artaphernes to attack Attica, to punish Athens for her intransigence. After burning Eretria, the Persians landed at Marathon.

An Athenian army of c. 10,000 hoplites marched to meet the Persian army of about 25,000 troops. The Athenians were at a significant disadvantage both strategically and tactically. Raising such a large army had denuded Athens of defenders, and thus any attack in the Athenian rear would cut off the Army from the City. Tactically, the hoplites were very vulnerable to attacks by cavalry, and the Athenians had no cavalry to defend the flanks. After several days of stalemate at Marathon, the Persian commanders attempted to take strategic advantage by sending their cavalry (by ship) to raid Athens itself. This gave the Athenian army a small window of opportunity to attack the remainder of the Persian Army.

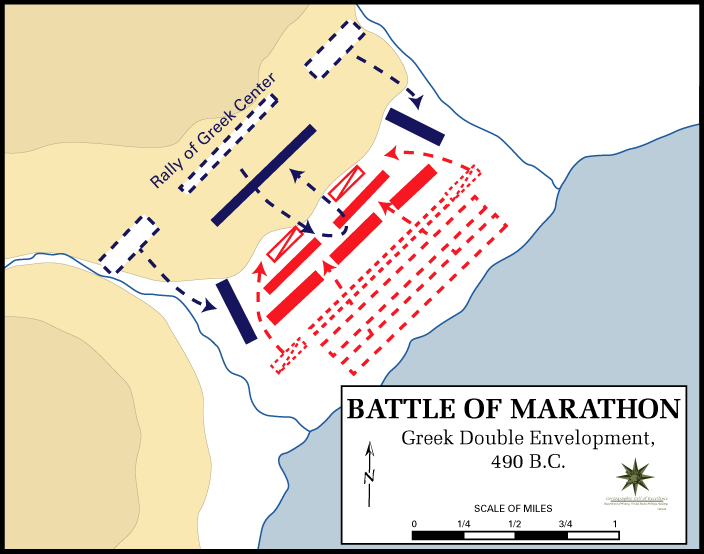
The Greek wings (blue) envelop the Persian wings (red)

This was the first true engagement between a hoplite army and a non-Greek army. The Persians had acquired a reputation for invincibility, but the Athenian hoplites proved crushingly superior in the ensuing infantry battle. To counter the massive numbers of Persians, the Greek general Miltiades ordered the troops to be spread across an unusually wide front, leaving the centre of the Greek line undermanned. However, the lightly armored Persian infantry proved no match for the heavily armored hoplites, and the Persian wings were quickly routed. The Greek wings then turned against the elite troops in the Persian centre, which had held the Greek centre until then. Marathon demonstrated to the Greeks the lethal potential of the hoplite, and firmly demonstrated that the Persians were not, after all, invincible.

The revenge of the Persians was postponed 10 years by internal conflicts in the Persian Empire, until Darius's son Xerxes returned to Greece in 480 BC with a staggeringly large army (modern estimates suggest between 150,000 and 250,000 men). Many Greeks city-states, having had plenty of warning of the forthcoming invasion, formed an anti-Persian league; though as before, other city-states remained neutral or allied with Persia. Although alliances between city-states were commonplace, the scale of this league was a novelty, and the first time that the Greeks had united in such a way to face an external threat.

This allowed diversification of the allied armed forces, rather than simply mustering a very large hoplite army. The visionary Athenian politician Themistocles had successfully persuaded his fellow citizens to build a huge fleet in 483/82 BC to combat the Persian threat (and thus to effectively abandon their hoplite army, since there were not men enough for both). Amongst the allies therefore, Athens was able to form the core of a navy, whilst other cities, including Sparta, provided the army. This alliance thus removed the constraints on the type of armed forces that the Greeks could use. The use of such a large navy was also a novelty to the Greeks.

The second Persian invasion is famous for the battles of Thermopylae and Salamis. As the massive Persian army moved south through Greece, the allies sent a small holding force (c. 10,000) men under the Spartan king Leonidas, to block the pass of Thermopylae whilst the main allied army could be assembled. The allied navy extended this blockade at sea, blocking the nearby straits of Artemisium, to prevent the huge Persian navy landing troops in Leonidas's rear. Famously, Leonidas's men held the much larger Persian army at the pass (where their numbers were less of an advantage) for three days, the hoplites again proving their superiority.

Only when a Persian force managed to outflank them by means of a mountain track was the allied army overcome; but by then Leonidas had dismissed the majority of the troops, remaining with a rearguard of 300 Spartans (and perhaps 2000 other troops), in the process making one of history's great last stands. The Greek navy, despite their lack of experience, also proved their worth holding back the Persian fleet whilst the army still held the pass.

Thermopylae provided the Greeks with time to arrange their defences, and they dug in across the Isthmus of Corinth, an impregnable position; although an evacuated Athens was thereby sacrificed to the advancing Persians. In order to outflank the isthmus, Xerxes needed to use this fleet, and in turn therefore needed to defeat the Greek fleet; similarly, the Greeks needed to neutralise the Persian fleet to ensure their safety. To this end, the Greeks were able to lure the Persian fleet into the straits of Salamis; and, in a battleground where Persian numbers again counted for nothing, they won a decisive victory, justifying Themistocles' decision to build the Athenian fleet. Demoralised, Xerxes returned to Asia Minor with much of his army, leaving his general Mardonius to campaign in Greece the following year (479 BC).

However, a united Greek army of c. 40,000 hoplites decisively defeated Mardonius at the Battle of Plataea, effectively ending the invasion. Almost simultaneously, the allied fleet defeated the remnants of the Persian navy at Mycale, thus destroying the Persian hold on the islands of the Aegean.

The remainder of the wars saw the Greeks take the fight to the Persians. The Athenian dominated Delian League of cities and islands extirpated Persian garrisons from Macedon and Thrace, before eventually freeing the Ionian cities from Persian rule. At one point, the Greeks even attempted an invasion of Cyprus and Egypt (which proved disastrous), demonstrating a major legacy of the Persian Wars: warfare in Greece had moved beyond the seasonal squabbles between city-states, to coordinated international actions involving huge armies. After the war, ambitions of many Greek states dramatically increased. Tensions resulting from this, and the rise of Athens and Sparta as pre-eminent powers during the war led directly to the Peloponnesian War, which saw further development of the nature of warfare, strategy and tactics.

=== The Peloponnesian War ===
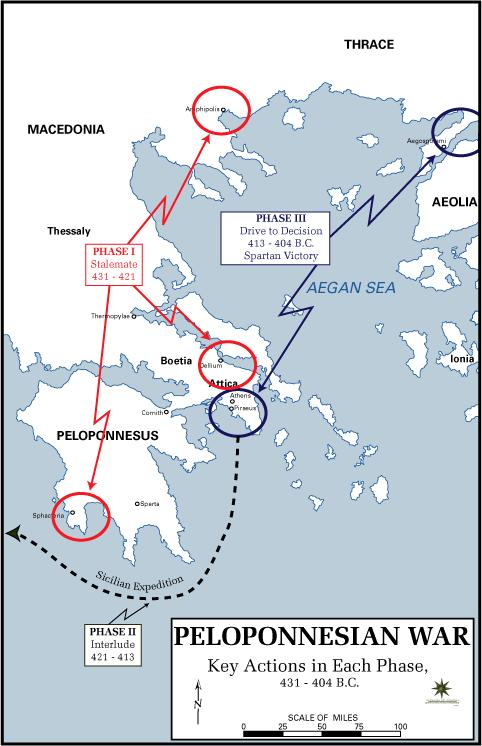
The key actions of each phase

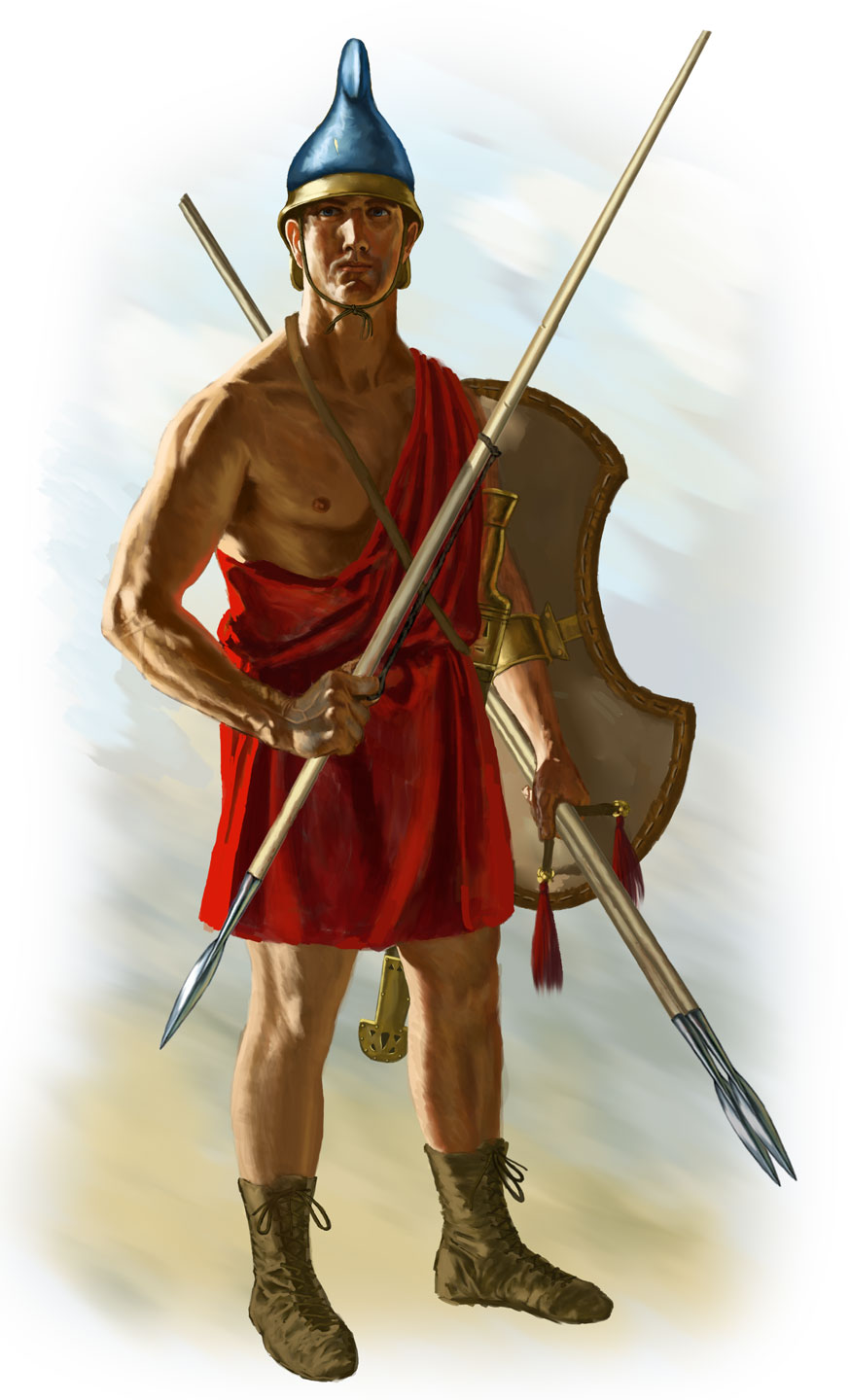
Agrianian peltast holding three javelins, one in his throwing hand and two in his pelte hand as additional ammunition

The Peloponnesian War (431–404 BC), was fought between the Athenian dominated Delian League and the Spartan dominated Peloponnesian League. The increased manpower and financial resources increased the scale, and allowed the diversification of warfare. Set-piece battles during this war proved indecisive and instead there was increased reliance on naval warfare, and strategies of attrition such as blockades and sieges. These changes greatly increased the number of casualties and the disruption of Greek society.

Whatever the proximal causes of the war, it was in essence a conflict between Athens and Sparta for supremacy in Greece. The war (or wars, since it is often divided into three periods) was for much of the time a stalemate, punctuated with occasional bouts of activity. Tactically the Peloponnesian war represents something of a stagnation; the strategic elements were most important as the two sides tried to break the deadlock, something of a novelty in Greek warfare.

Building on the experience of the Persian Wars, the diversification from core hoplite warfare, permitted by increased resources, continued. There was increased emphasis on navies, sieges, mercenaries and economic warfare. Far from the previously limited and formalized form of conflict, the Peloponnesian War transformed into an all-out struggle between city-states, complete with atrocities on a large scale; shattering religious and cultural taboos, devastating vast swathes of countryside and destroying whole cities.

From the start, the mismatch in the opposing forces was clear. The Delian League (hereafter 'Athenians') were primarily a naval power, whereas the Peloponnesian League (hereafter 'Spartans') consisted of primarily land-based powers. The Athenians thus avoided battle on land, since they could not possibly win, and instead dominated the sea, blockading the Peloponnesus whilst maintaining their trade. Conversely, the Spartans repeatedly invaded Attica, but only for a few weeks at a time; they remained wedded to the idea of hoplite-as-citizen. Although both sides suffered setbacks and victories, the first phase essentially ended in stalemate, as neither league had the power to neutralise the other. The second phase, an Athenian expedition to attack Syracuse in Sicily achieved no tangible result other than a large loss of Athenian ships and men.

In the third phase of the war however the use of more sophisticated stratagems eventually allowed the Spartans to force Athens to surrender. Firstly, the Spartans permanently garrisoned a part of Attica, removing from Athenian control the silver mine which funded the war effort. Forced to squeeze even more money from her allies, the Athenian league thus became heavily strained. After the loss of Athenian ships and men in the Sicilian expedition, Sparta was able to foment rebellion amongst the Athenian league, which therefore massively reduced the ability of the Athenians to continue the war.

Athens in fact partially recovered from this setback between 410 and 406 BC, but a further act of economic war finally forced her defeat. Having developed a navy that was capable of taking on the much-weakened Athenian navy, the Spartan general Lysander seized the Hellespont, the source of Athens' grain. The remaining Athenian fleet was thereby forced to confront the Spartans, and were decisively defeated. Athens had little choice but to surrender; and was stripped of her city walls, overseas possessions and navy.

==== Mercenaries and light infantry ====
Although tactically there was little innovation in the Peloponessian War, there does appear to have been an increase in the use of light infantry, such as peltasts (javelin throwers) and archers. Many of these would have been mercenary troops, hired from outlying regions of Greece. For instance, the Agrianes from Thrace were well-renowned peltasts, whilst Crete was famous for its archers. Since there were no decisive land-battles in the Peloponnesian War, the presence or absence of these troops was unlikely to have affected the course of the war. Nevertheless, it was an important innovation, one which was developed much further in later conflicts. Sileraioi were also a group of ancient mercenaries most likely employed by the tyrant Dionysius I of Syracuse

=== Spartan & Theban hegemonies ===
Following the eventual defeat of the Athenians in 404 BC, and the disbandment of the Athenian-dominated Delian League, Ancient Greece fell under the hegemony of Sparta. The peace treaty which ended the Peloponnesian War left Sparta as the de facto ruler of Greece (hegemon). Although the Spartans did not attempt to rule all of Greece directly, they prevented alliances of other Greek cities, and forced the city-states to accept governments deemed suitable by Sparta.

However, from the very beginning, it was clear that the Spartan hegemony was shaky; the Athenians, despite their crushing defeat, restored their democracy but just one year later, ejecting the Sparta-approved oligarchy. The Spartans did not feel strong enough to impose their will on a shattered Athens. Undoubtedly part of the reason for the weakness of the hegemony was a decline in the Spartan population.

This did not go unnoticed by the Persian Empire, which sponsored a rebellion by the combined powers of Athens, Thebes, Corinth and Argos, resulting in the Corinthian War (395–387 BC). This was the first major challenge Sparta faced.

The early encounters, at Nemea and Coronea were typical engagements of hoplite phalanxes, resulting in Spartan victories. However, the Spartans suffered a large setback when their fleet was wiped out by a Persian Fleet at the Battle of Cnidus, undermining the campaign of the Spartan king Agesilaus II in Ionia. The war petered out after 394 BC, with a stalemate punctuated with minor engagements. One of these is particularly notable however; at the Battle of Lechaeum, an Athenian force composed mostly of light troops (e.g. peltasts) defeated a Spartan regiment...

The Athenian general Iphicrates had his troops make repeated hit and run attacks on the Spartans, who, having neither peltasts nor cavalry, could not respond effectively. The defeat of a hoplite army in this way demonstrates the changes in both troops and tactic which had occurred in Greek Warfare.

The war ended when the Persians, worried by the allies' successes, switched to supporting the Spartans, in return for the cities of Ionia and Spartan non-interference in Asia Minor. This brought the rebels to terms, and restored the Spartan hegemony on a more stable footing. The peace treaty which ended the war, effectively restored the status quo ante bellum, although Athens was permitted to retain some of the territory it had regained during the war. The Spartan hegemony would last another 16 years...

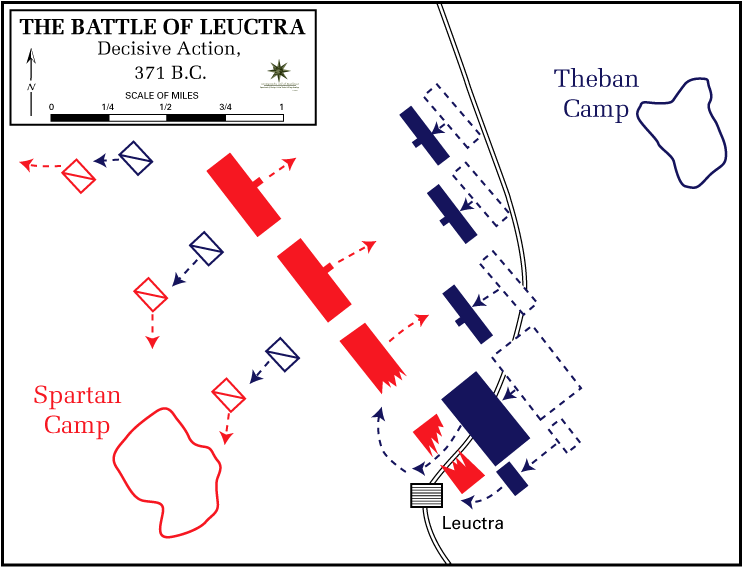
The Battle of Leuctra, 371 BC, showing Epaminondas's tactical advances

The second major challenge Sparta faced was fatal to its hegemony, and even to its position as a first-rate power in Greece. As the Thebans attempted to expand their influence over Boeotia, they inevitably incurred the ire of Sparta. After they refused to disband their army, an army of approximately 10,000 Spartans and Pelopennesians marched north to challenge the Thebans. At the decisive Battle of Leuctra (371 BC), the Thebans routed the allied army. The battle is famous for the tactical innovations of the Theban general Epaminondas.

Defying convention, he strengthened the left flank of the phalanx to an unheard of depth of 50 ranks, at the expense of the centre and the right. The centre and right were staggered backwards from the left (an 'echelon' formation), so that the phalanx advanced obliquely. The Theban left wing was thus able to crush the elite Spartan forces on the allied right, whilst the Theban centre and left avoided engagement; after the defeat of the Spartans and the death of the Spartan king, the rest of the allied army routed. This is one of the first known examples of both the tactic of local concentration of force, and the tactic of 'refusing a flank'.

Following this victory, the Thebans first secured their power-base in Boeotia, before marching on Sparta. As the Thebans were joined by many erstwhile Spartan allies, the Spartans were powerless to resist this invasion. The Thebans marched into Messenia, and freed it from Sparta; this was a fatal blow to Sparta, since Messenia had provided most of the helots which supported the Spartan warrior society. These events permanently reduced Spartan power and prestige, and replaced the Spartan hegemony with a Theban one. The Theban hegemony would be short-lived however.

Opposition to it throughout the period 369–362 BC caused numerous clashes. In an attempt to bolster the Thebans' position, Epaminondas again marched on the Pelopennese in 362 BC. At the Battle of Mantinea, the largest battle ever fought between the Greek city-states occurred; most states were represented on one side or the other. Epaminondas deployed tactics similar to those at Leuctra, and again the Thebans, positioned on the left, routed the Spartans, and thereby won the battle. However, such were the losses of Theban manpower, including Epaminondas himself, that Thebes was thereafter unable to sustain its hegemony. Conversely, another defeat and loss of prestige meant that Sparta was unable to regain its primary position in Greece. Ultimately, Mantinea, and the preceding decade, severely weakened many Greek states, and left them divided and without the leadership of a dominant power.

=== The rise of Macedon and the end of the hoplite era ===
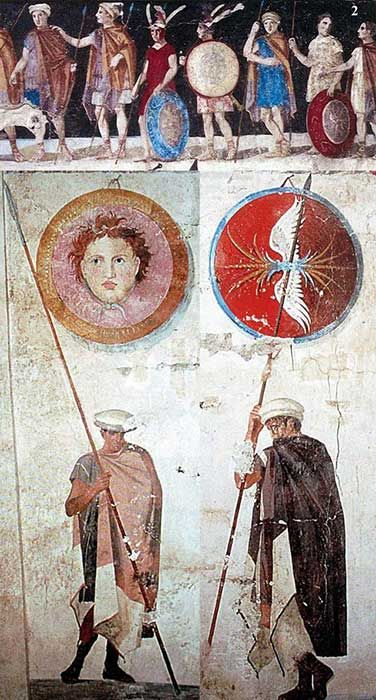
Paintings of Ancient Macedonian soldiers, arms, and armaments, from the tomb of Agios Athanasios, Thessaloniki in Central Macedonia, Greece, 4th century BC

Although by the end of the Theban hegemony the cities of southern Greece were severely weakened, they might have risen again had it not been for the ascent to power of the Macedonian kingdom in northern Greece. Unlike the fiercely independent (and small) city-states, Macedon was a tribal kingdom, ruled by an autocratic king, and importantly, covering a larger area. Once firmly unified, and then expanded, by Philip II, Macedon possessed the resources that enabled it to dominate the weakened and divided states in southern Greece. Between 356 and 342 BC Phillip conquered all city states in the vicinity of Macedon, then Thessaly and then Thrace.

Finally Phillip sought to establish his own hegemony over the southern Greek city-states, and after defeating the combined forces of Athens and Thebes, the two most powerful states, at the Battle of Chaeronea in 338 BC, succeeded. Now unable to resist him, Phillip compelled most of the city states of southern Greece (including Athens, Thebes, Corinth and Argos; but not Sparta) to join the Corinthian League, and therefore become allied to him.

This established a lasting Macedonian hegemony over Greece, and allowed Phillip the resources and security to launch a war against the Persian Empire. After his assassination, this war was prosecuted by his son Alexander the Great, and resulted in the takeover of the whole Achaemenid Empire by the Macedonians. A united Macedonian empire did not long survive Alexander's death, and soon split into the Hellenistic kingdoms of the Diadochi (Alexander's generals). However, these kingdoms were still enormous states, and continued to fight in the same manner as Phillip and Alexander's armies had. The rise of Macedon and her successors thus sounded the death knell for the distinctive way of war found in Ancient Greece; and instead contributed to the 'superpower' warfare which would dominate the ancient world between 350 and 150 BC.

==== The innovations of Phillip II ====
One major reason for Phillip's success in conquering Greece was the break with Hellenic military traditions that he made. With more resources available, he was able to assemble a more diverse army, including strong cavalry components. He took the development of the phalanx to its logical completion, arming his 'phalangites' (for they were assuredly not hoplites) with a fearsome 6 m (20 ft) pike, the 'sarissa'. Much more lightly armored, the Macedonian phalanx was not so much a shield-wall as a spear-wall. The Macedonian phalanx was a supreme defensive formation, but was not intended to be decisive offensively; instead, it was used to pin down the enemy infantry, whilst more mobile forces, such as cavalry and hypaspists outflanked them. This 'combined arms' approach was furthered by the extensive use of skirmishers, such as peltasts.

Tactically, Phillip absorbed the lessons of centuries of warfare in Greece. He echoed the tactics of Epaminondas at Chaeronea, by not engaging his right wing against the Thebans until his left wing had routed the Athenians; thus in course outnumbering and outflanking the Thebans, and securing victory.

==== Alexander's tactics ====
Alexander's fame is in no small part due to his success as a battlefield tactician; the unorthodox gambits he used at the battles of Issus and Gaugamela were unlike anything seen in Ancient Greece before. The battle of Hydaspes was the first battle that an army from Greece faced a large number of Indian war elephants.

== Hellenistic warfare ==
The beginning of the Hellenistic period and the Wars of the Diadochi marked the transition to the Hellenistic warfare.

== See also ==
- Spartan army
- Makedonian army
- Athenian navy
- Theban army
- Pyrrhic army
- Cretan archers
- Roman army
- History of physical training and fitness
- Title
  - Polemarch
- Units and formation
  - Ekdromoi
  - Epistates
  - Lochos
  - Promachos
  - Protostates
  - Zeus
  - Shield bearer
- Weapon
  - Aspis
  - Clipeus

== Bibliography ==
- Adcock, Frank E., The Greek and Macedonian Art of War, Berkeley, CA: University of California Press, 1962.
- Anderson, J. K., Ancient Greek Horsemanship, Berkeley, CA: University of California Press, 1961.
- Anderson, J. K., Military Theory and Practice in the Age of Xenophon, Berkeley, CA: University of California Press, 1970.
- Anderson, J.K. 1969. Review of Greek Oared Ships 900-322 B.C. by J. S. Morrison. Classical Philology 64: 180-183.
- Best, Jan G. P., Thracian Peltasts and their Influence on the Greek Warfare, Groningen: Wolters-Noordhoff, 1969.
- Brouwers, Josho, Henchmen of Ares: Warriors and Warfare in Early Greece, Rotterdam: Karwansaray Publishers, 2013.
- Cartledge, Paul, The Spartans: The World of the Warrior-Heroes of Ancient Greece, from Utopia to Crisis and Collapse, New York, NY: Vintage, 2004.
- Casson, Lionel. 1991. The Ancient Mariners: Seafarers and Sea Fighters of the Mediterranean in Ancient Times, 89-96. Princeton: Princeton University Press.
- Connolly, Peter, Greece and Rome at War, London: Greenhill Books, 1998.
- Delbruck, Hans, Warfare in Antiquity, History of the Art of War, Volume 1, Lincoln, NE: University of Nebraska Press, 1990.
- Echeverría, Fernando, "Hoplite and Phalanx in Archaic and Classical Greece: A Reassessment", Classical Philology, Vol. 107, No. 4, 2012, pp. 291-318.
- Engels, Donald, Alexander the Great and the Logistics of the Macedonian Army, Berkeley, CA: University of California Press, 1978.
- Fisher, Nick, "Hybris, Revenge and Stasis in the Greek City-States," in Hans van Wees, War and Violence in Ancient Greece, London and Swansea: Duckworth and the Classical Press of Wales, 2000, pp. 83–124.
- Hammond, Nicholas G. L., A History of Greece to 322 B.C., Oxford: Clarendon Press, 1959.
- Hanson, Victor Davis (2000). The Western Way of War: Infantry Battle in Classical Greece. University of California Press. ISBN 0-520-21911-2.
- Hanson, Victor D., "Hoplite Battle as Ancient Greek Warfare: When, Where, and Why?" in Hans van Wees, War and Violence in Ancient Greece, London and Swansea: Duckworth and the Classical Press of Wales, 2000, pp. 201–232.
- Hodkinson, Stephen, "Warfare, Wealth, and the Crisis of Spartiate Society," in John Rich and Graham Shipley, (eds.), War and Society in the Greek World, London: Routledge, 1993, pp. 146–176.
- Holladay, A.J. 1988. "Further Thoughts on Trireme Tactics." Greece and RomeSecond Series 35: 149-151.
- Hornblower, Simon, "Sticks, Stones, and Spartans: The Sociology of Spartan Violence," in Hans van Wees, War and Violence in Ancient Greece, London and Swansea: Duckworth and the Classical Press of Wales, 2000, pp. 57–82.
- Jordan, Boromir. 1975. The Athenian Navy in the Classical Period: A Study of Athenian Naval Administration and Military Organization in the Fifth and Fourth Centuries B.C. University of California Publications: Classical Studies 13. Berkeley and Los Angeles: University of California Press.
- Kagan, Donald, The Peloponnesian War, New York, NY: Penguin Books, 2004.
- Konijnendijk, Roel, Classical Greek Tactics: A Cultural History. (Mnemosyne, Supplements 409). Leiden/Boston: Brill, 2018.
- Krentz, Peter, "Deception in Archaic and Classical Greek Warfare," in Hans van Wees, War and Violence in Ancient Greece, London and Swansea: Duckworth and the Classical Press of Wales, 2000, pp. 167–200.
- Lazenby, John F., "The Killing Zone," in Victor D. Hanson, (ed.), Hoplites: The Classical Greek Battle Experience, London: Routledge, 1993.
- Lazenby, John F., "Hoplite Warfare," in John Hackett, (ed.), Warfare in the Ancient World, pp. 54–81.
- Lazenby, John F., Spartan Army, Warminster, Wiltshire: Aris & Phillips, 1985.
- Lazenby, J.F. (1987-10-01). "The Diekplous." Greece & Rome. Second Series 34(2): 169-177.
- Lazenby, John F., The Peloponnesian War: A Military Study, London: Routledge, 2004.
- Lendon, J.E., Soldiers & Ghosts: A History of Battle in Classical Antiquity, New Haven and London: Yale University Press, 2005.
- Morrison, J.S. 1974. "Greek Naval Tactics in the 5th century BC." International Journal of Nautical Archaeology and Underwater Exploration 3: 21-26.
- Parke, Herbert W., Greek Mercenary Soldiers: From the Earliest Times to the Battle of Ipsus, Oxford: Clarendon Press, 1970.
- Pritchett, Kendrick W., The Greek State at War, 5 Vols., Berkeley, CA: University of California Press, 1975–1991.
- Polybius (2011). The Histories. Translated by W.R. Paton. Harvard University Press.
- Rawlings, Louis (2007). The Ancient Greeks at War. Manchester University Press. ISBN 978 0 7190 56574.
- Rawlings, Louis, "Alternative Agonies: Hoplite Martial and Combat Experiences beyond the Phalanx," in Hans van Wees, War and Violence in Ancient Greece, London and Swansea: Duckworth and the Classical Press of Wales, 2000, pp. 233–260.
- Sekunda, Nick, Elite 7: The Ancient Greeks, Oxford: Osprey, 1986.
- Sekunda, Nick, Elite 66: The Spartan Army, Oxford: Osprey, 1998.
- Sekunda, Nick, Warrior 27: Greek Hoplite 480–323 BC, Oxford: Osprey, 2000.
- Snodgrass, A., "The Hoplite Reform and History," Journal of Hellenic Studies, Vol. 85, 1965, pp. 110–122.
- Strauss, Barry S. 2000. "Democracy, Kimon, and the Evolution of the Athenian Naval Tactics in the Fifth Century BC." In Polis & Politics: Studies in Ancient Greek History, ed. By Pernille Flensted-Jensen, Thomas Heine Nielsen, and Lene Rubinstein, 315-326. Copenhagen: Museum Tusculanum Press, University of Copenhagen.*Van Crefeld, Martin, Technology and War: From 2000 B.C. to the Present, New York, NY: Free Press, 1989.
- Van der Heyden, A. A. M. and Scullard, H. H., (eds.), Atlas of the Classical World, London: Nelson, 1959.
- Van Wees, Hans, Greek Warfare: Myths and Realities, London: Duckworth, 2005.
- Van Wees, Hans, "The Development of the Hoplite Phalanx: Iconography Reality in the Seventh Century," in Hans van Wees, War and Violence in Ancient Greece, London and Swansea: Duckworth and the Classical Press of Wales, 2000, pp. 125–166.
- Wheeler, E., "The General as Hoplite," in Hanson, Victor D., (ed.), Hoplites, London: 1991, pp.
- Whitehead, Ian (1987-10-01). "The Periplous". Greece & Rome. Second Series 34 (2): 178–185.
