= Xyston =

Ancient Greek polearm

The xyston (Ancient Greek: ξυστόν "spear, javelin; pointed or spiked stick, goad), was a type of a long thrusting spear in ancient Greece. It measured about 3.5 to 4.25 m (11 to 14 ft) long and was probably held by the cavalryman with both hands. It had a wooden shaft and a spear-point at both ends. Possible reasons for the secondary spear-tip were that it acted partly as a counterweight and also served as a backup in case the xyston was broken in action. The xyston is usually mentioned in context with the hetairoi (ἑταῖροι), the cavalry forces of ancient Macedon. After Alexander the Great's death, the hetairoi were named xystophoroi (ξυστοφόροι, "spear-bearers") because of their use of the xyston lance. In his Greek-written Bellum Judaicum, the Jewish historian Flavius Josephus uses the term xyston to describe the Roman throwing javelin, the pilum.

The xyston was wielded either underarm or overarm, presumably as a matter of personal preference. It was also known, especially later, as the kontos; meaning literally "barge-pole"; the name possibly originated as a slang term for the weapon.

It is made of cornel wood. The recorded density is 51.5 lbs per cubic foot (825 kg/m^{3}), or 0.03 lb per cubic inch (0.83 g/cm^{3}).

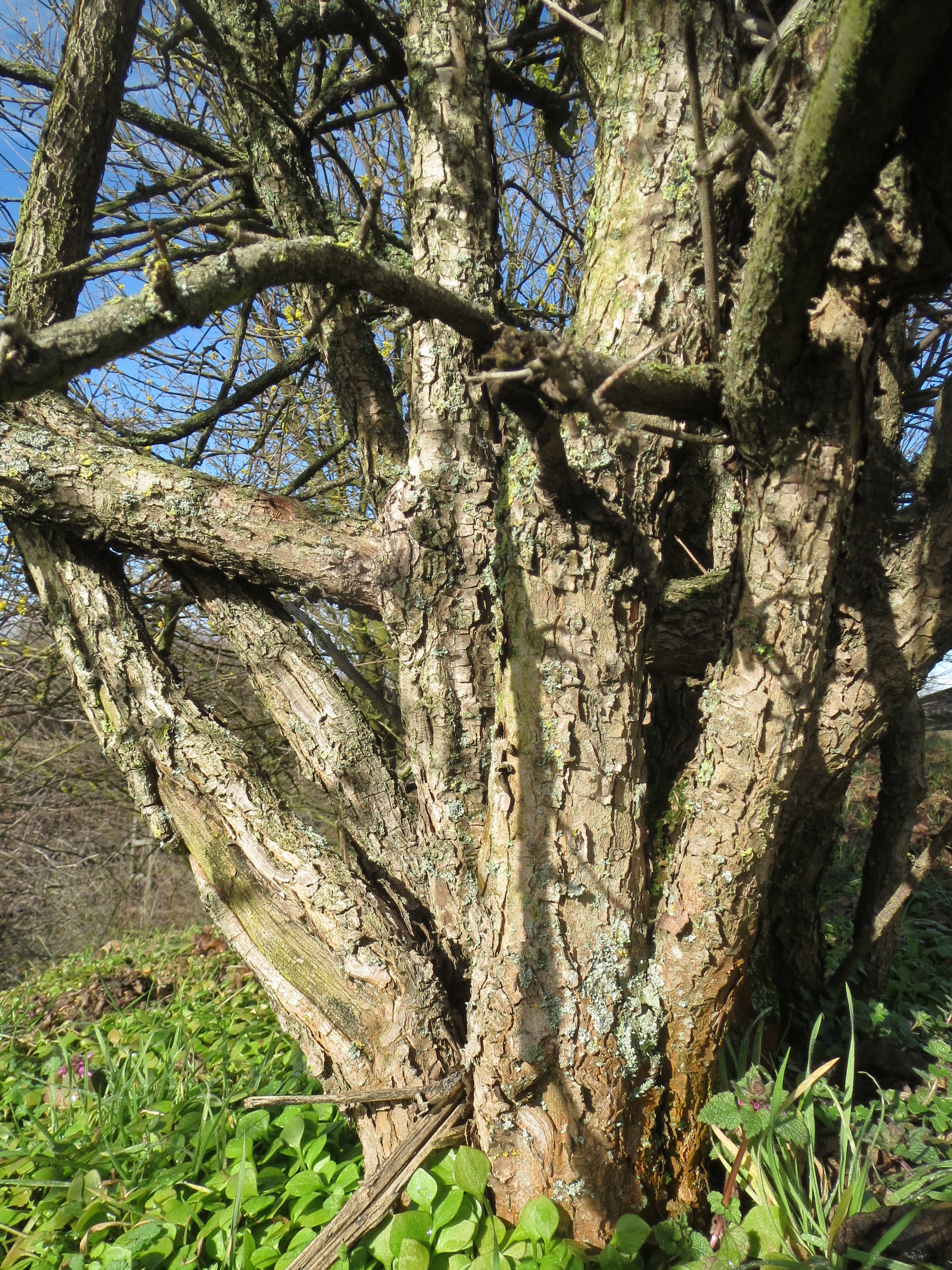
Cornus mas wood

Cornus mas, also known as the Cornelian cherry, is common in the wood mountains that surround Macedonia, ranging from areas in the Balkans and into Syria; some specific locations are Mt. Olympus, Phthiotis, Aetolia, Arcadia, Laconis.

This cornel wood was used for the spear, because of its elasticity and hardness, making it very durable and a good material for spears, javelins, and bows. The cornel wood was effective compared to other woods, for uses such as these. The wood, despite being used for a spear that was so long, was able to withstand the weight of itself; it was tough enough to not need thickness to balance the weight of its length, while still maintaining its elasticity.

== See also ==
- Ancient Macedonian military
- Hellenistic armies
- Dory (spear)
- Kontos
- Polearm
- Sarissa

== Bibliography ==
- Markle, Minor M. (1977). "The Macedonian Sarissa, Spear, and Related Armor". American Journal of Archaeology. 81 (3): 323–339. doi:10.2307/503007. ISSN 0002-9114. JSTOR 503007. S2CID 192966553.
- LSJ - ξυστόν from verbal adjective ξυστός, which is in turn derived from the verb ξύω (shave, scrape).
