= Kontos (weapon) =

Ancient pole weapon

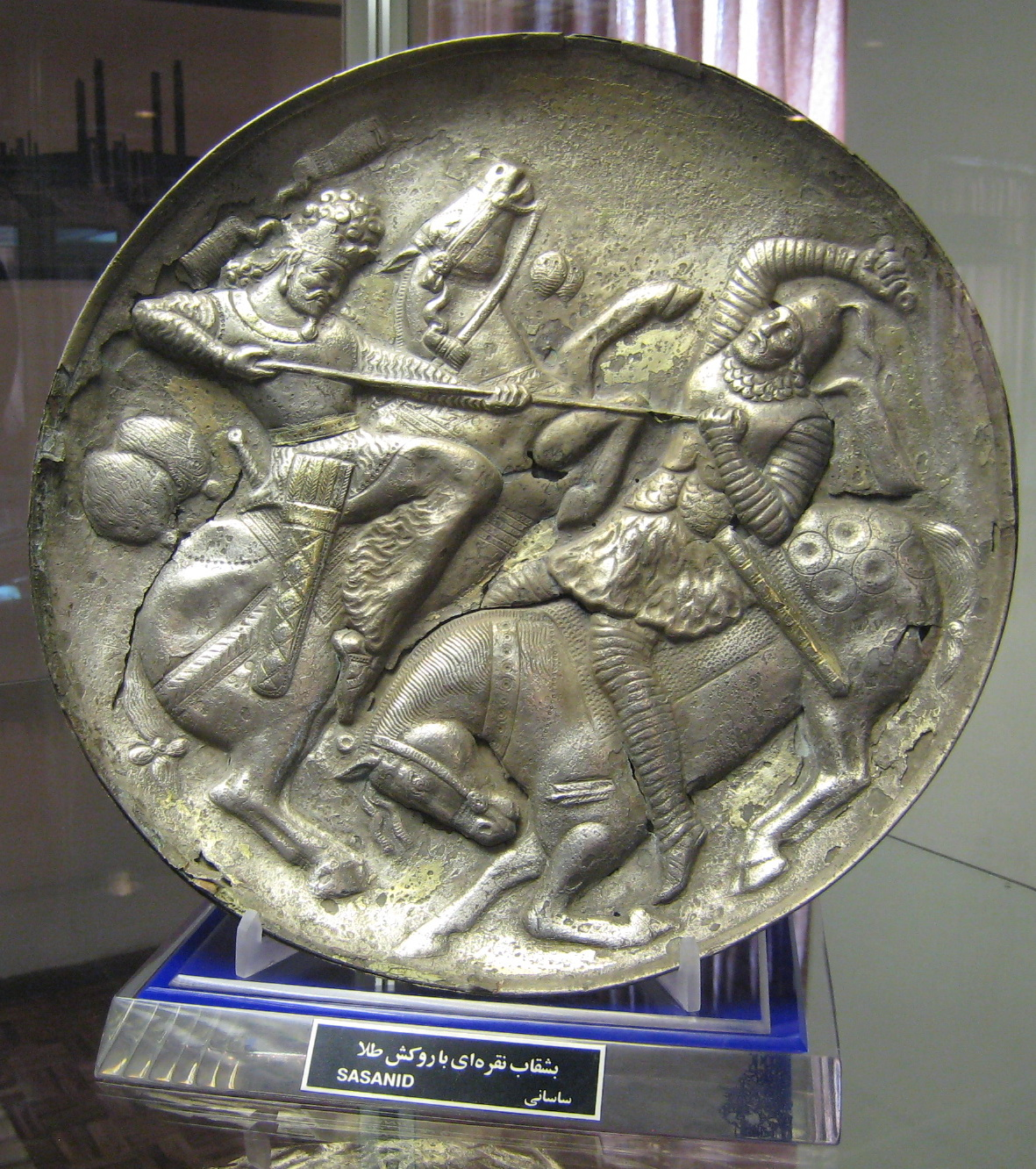
Sassanian silver plate showing lance combat

The kontos or contus (Ancient Greek: κοντός, from κεντέω meaning to prick or pierce) was a type of long pike with a pointed iron at the one end. Initially it was used for a variety of reasons, but most notably as a punt-pole by sailors who put it into the ground in shallow water, thereby pushing on the boat, and as a means of determining the depth of the water. Later, the term applied to the long pikes or lances which were used as weapons and the soldier armed with it were called Contarii and Contati (κοντόφοροι, meaning contus-bearers). Romans used this term to described the huge pike of the Germanic warriors and the long pikes of the Sarmatians.

It also described the wooden cavalry lance used by the Iranians, especially Achaemenid successors' cavalry, most notably cataphracts (Grivpanvar). A shift in the terminology used to describe Sarmatian weapons indicates the kontos was developed in the early to mid-1st century AD from shorter spear-type weapons (which were described using the generic terms for "spear"—longhe or hasta—by Greek and Roman sources, respectively), though such a description may have existed before the Battle of Carrhae, in which Parthian cataphracts, in conjunction with light horse archers, annihilated a Roman army of over three times their numbers.

As shown by contemporary artwork, the kontos was about 4 m (13 ft) long, though longer examples may have existed; later Parthian and Sassanian clibanarii (Middle Persian: Grivpanvar) reportedly used kontoi of longer lengths; only highly trained cavalrymen such as those fielded by the Arsaco-Sassanian dynasties could have used such weapons. It was reputedly a weapon of great power compared to other cavalry weapons of its time, described by Plutarch as being "heavy with steel" and capable of impaling two men at once. Its length was probably the origin of its name, as the word kontos could also mean "oar" or "barge-pole" in Greek. Thus, it had to be wielded with two hands while directing the horse using the knees; this made it a specialist weapon that required extensive training and excellent horsemanship to use. In addition, most Parthian cavalry (even possibly including cataphracts) carried bows, so this meant daily practice with the weapons.

The Romans adopted a variation of the kontos transliterated as contus. The Roman contus was also wielded two-handed. The later Byzantine kontarion was used by Byzantine cataphracts, from c. 1100 it was used single-handed couched under the armpit, as was the contemporary knightly lance.

The Sasanian lance, known as nēzak (Middle Persian), used by the aswaran cavalry, was derived from the Parthian kontos. The Parthian version was a 3.7 m (12 ft) lance featuring a sword-like iron-made blade 23.2 to 37.5 cm (9 to 15 in) in length socketed onto the shaft.

The name is the stem of many words for cavalry lances in languages of the region, like gönder (Hungarian, meaning "Roman lance"), and quntariya (Arabic: قَنْطَرِيّة).

== See also ==
- Sarissa
- Xyston
