= Lammert =

Lammert is a given name derived from Lambert and a surname. Notable people with the surname include:

== Given name ==
- Pieter Lammert Bon (born 1946), Dutch rower
- Lammert Huitema (born 1961), Dutch speed skater and cyclist
- Lammert Leertouwer (born 1932), Dutch theologian and university-president
- Lammert Bouke van der Meer (born 1945), Dutch classicist and classical archeologist
- Lammert Swart (1847–1909), Dutch commander of the Royal Netherlands East Indies Army

== Surname ==
Lammert

- Christian Lammert
- Edmund Lammert (1847–1921), German classical philologist
- Mark Lammert (born 1960), German painter, illustrator, graphic artist, and stage-designer
- Matthias Lammert (born 1968), German politician
- Norbert Lammert (born 1948), German politician
- Petra Lammert (born 1984), German shot-putter and bobsledder
- Will Lammert (1892–1957), German sculptor

Lammerts

- Johan Lammerts (born 1960), Dutch road bicycle racer
