= Cornelian tree =

Disambiguation page

Cornelian tree may refer to:

- Cornus florida
- Cornus mas
