= Minor M. Markle III =

American archaeologist

Minor Millikin Markle III (1935 – May 30, 2016) was an American scholar of ancient history, in particular the archaeology of Ancient Macedonia. He worked with the Greek archaeologist Manolis Andronikos and wrote a number of papers interpreting Andronikos's various finds, and attempted to reconstruct replicas of the weapons and equipment found in the tombs and barrows Andronikos excavated. His work was influential and widely cited, in particular his reconstruction of the sarissa, the Macedonian pike. In his later life, he worked as a Senior Lecturer in Classics and Ancient History at the University of New England in Armidale, New South Wales, Australia.

== Biography ==
Minor M. Markle III was born in 1935 as the eldest child of Minor and Mary Markle. Two younger sisters would later join the family, Carolyn and Marilyn. He grew up in Jonesboro, Arkansas. He studied English literature at Miami University in Ohio. With the aid of a Fulbright scholarship, he attended Magdalen College, Oxford where he studied classics and earned a Master of Arts degree. There, he befriended G. E. M. de Ste. Croix, an Oxford Professor who specialized in Ancient Greek history, and who would be an influence on his thought. He returned to Ohio to teach at Miami University in 1961–1967. He earned his PhD at Princeton University in New Jersey in 1967 with a thesis on Isocrates and Philip II of Macedon. Afterward, he taught at the University of Virginia from 1968 to 1978, and spent a year each at Johns Hopkins University (1977–1978) and at the Institute for Advanced Study in Princeton (1978–1979). However, he never found a tenure track position. He had a fellowship at the Center for Hellenic Studies from 1976–1977, and published a number of significant articles in the 1977–1982 period on his work based on the findings of Greek archaeologist Manolis Andronikos as well as Photios Petsas. His demonstration of his replica sarissa at the University of Virginia brought "attention from the public and the local police" alike. He left academia for a time to work in the antiques business. He received an offer to be a lecturer in Classics and Ancient History at the University of New England (UNE) in Australia, moved to Armidale in 1980, and swiftly was promoted to Senior Lecturer, perhaps as a result of him being somewhat overqualified for the job. He retired from UNE in 1998.

Markle died in his home in Invergowrie, near Armidale, on May 30, 2016.

== Selected works ==
- Markle, Minor M. (1976). "Support of Athenian Intellectuals for Philip: A Study of Isocrates' Philippus and Speusippus' Letter to Philip". The Journal of Hellenic Studies. 96: 80–99. doi:10.2307/631225. JSTOR 631225.
- Markle, Minor M. (1977). "The Macedonian Sarrissa, Spear and Related Armor". American Journal of Archaeology. 81 (3). Archaeological Institute of America: 323–339. doi:10.2307/503007. JSTOR 503007. S2CID 192966553.
- Markle, Minor M. (1978). "Use of the Sarissa by Philip and Alexander of Macedon". American Journal of Archaeology. 82 (4): 483–497. doi:10.2307/504637. JSTOR 504637.
- Markle, Minor M. (1980). "Weapons from the Cemetery at Vergina and Alexander's army". Megas Alexandros, 2300 chronia apo ton thanato tou. Makedonikē vivliothēkē. Vol. 57. Thessalonikē: Hetaireia Makedonikōn Spoudōn. pp. 243–267. OCLC 9154793.
- Markle, Minor M. (1982). "Macedonian Arms and Tactics under Alexander the Great". In Barr-Sharrar, Beryl (ed.). Macedonia and Greece in Late Classical and Early Hellenistic Times. Studies in the History of Art Symposium Series I. Vol. 10. Washington, DC: National Gallery of Art. pp. 86–111. JSTOR 42617923.
- Markle, Minor M. (1985). "Jury Pay and Assembly Pay at Athens". In Cartledge, P.A.; Harvey, F.D. (eds.). Crux: Essays Presented to G.E.M. de Ste. Croix on his 75th Birthday. Duckworth.
- Markle, Minor M. (1999). "A Shield Monument from Veria and the Chronology of Macedonian Shield Types". Hesperia. 68 (2): 219–254. doi:10.2307/148374. JSTOR 148374.
