= Dory (spear) =

Hoplite weapon in Ancient Greece

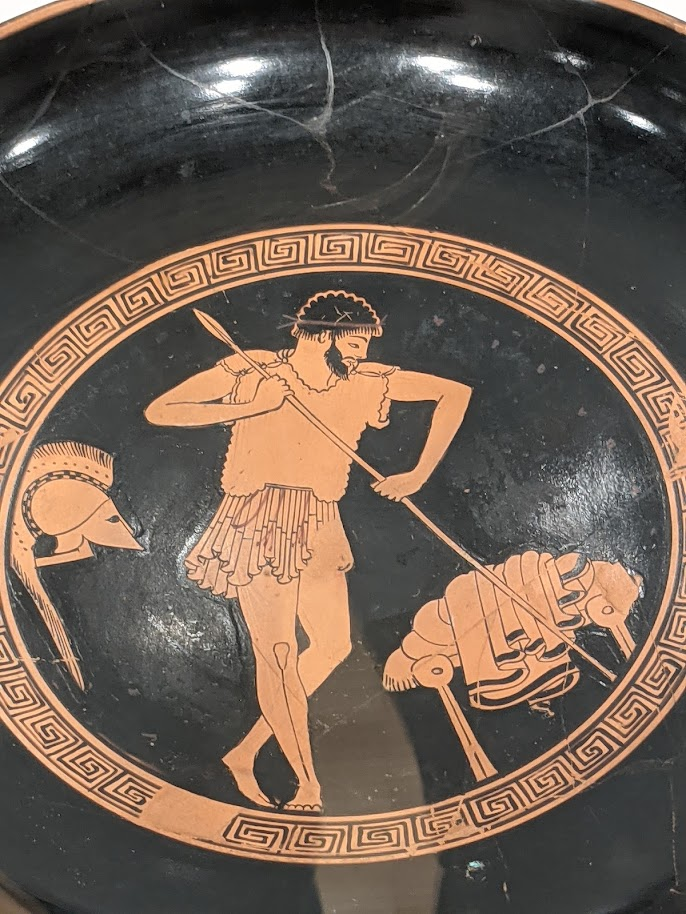
Hoplite with spear in an arming scene on the tondo of an Attic red-figure kylix (490–470 BC

The dory or doru (/ˈdɒruː/; Greek: δόρυ) was the chief spear of hoplites (heavy infantry) in Ancient Greece. A small dory was called doration (δοράτιον). The word doru is first attested in the Homeric epics with the meanings of "wood" and "spear". Homeric heroes hold two dorata (Greek: δόρατα, plural of δόρυ) (Il. 11,43, Od. 1, 256).

The spear used by the Persian army under Darius I and Xerxes in their respective campaigns during the Greco-Persian Wars was shorter than that of their Greek opponents. The dory's length enabled multiple ranks of a formation to engage simultaneously during combat.

The dory was not intended for throwing, such as a dart or javelin. However, its aerodynamic shape allowed the dory to be thrown. Because it had evolved for combat between phalanxes, it was constructed so as to be adequate against the defences of Greek infantry, which incorporated bronze in shield and helmet construction. Hoplites were generally more heavily armored than infantry of their non-Greek contemporaries.

Should not be confused with Dorydrepanon (δορυδρέπανον, from δόρυ (Dory) + δρέπανον (Sickle)) which was a kind of Halberd and was used for cutting off halyards in sea-fights and for pulling down battlements in sieges.

== Dory-Derived Expressions and Terms ==
In classical antiquity, the dory was a symbol of military power, possibly more important than the sword, as can be inferred from expressions like "Troy conquered by dory" (Il. 16,708) and words like "doryktetos" (Greek: δορίκτητος) (spear-won) and "doryalotos" (Greek: δορυάλωτος) (spear-taken). Doriklutos (Δορίκλυτος) means "spear-famed" or "renowned for the spear", while the expression "dorikthtos ploutos" (δορίκτητος πλοῦτος, "spear-won wealth") refers to wealth gained through war.

The Greeks also used the expression "Σὺν δορί, σὺν ἀσπίδι" ("with spear (dory) and shield") as a proverb meaning "to pursue something by every possible means".

Dory kerykeion (Δόρυ κηρύκειον; "A spear as a herald's wand") was a Greek proverb used of people who both urge or reassure and threaten at the same time, presenting themselves as peaceful while preparing for violence. It comes from a story in which the Gephyraeans, after consulting the oracle at Delphi, migrated to Tanagra during a war involving Athens and Eumolpus, sending a leader ahead with a herald's staff as a sign of peace while armed men followed behind.

== Details ==
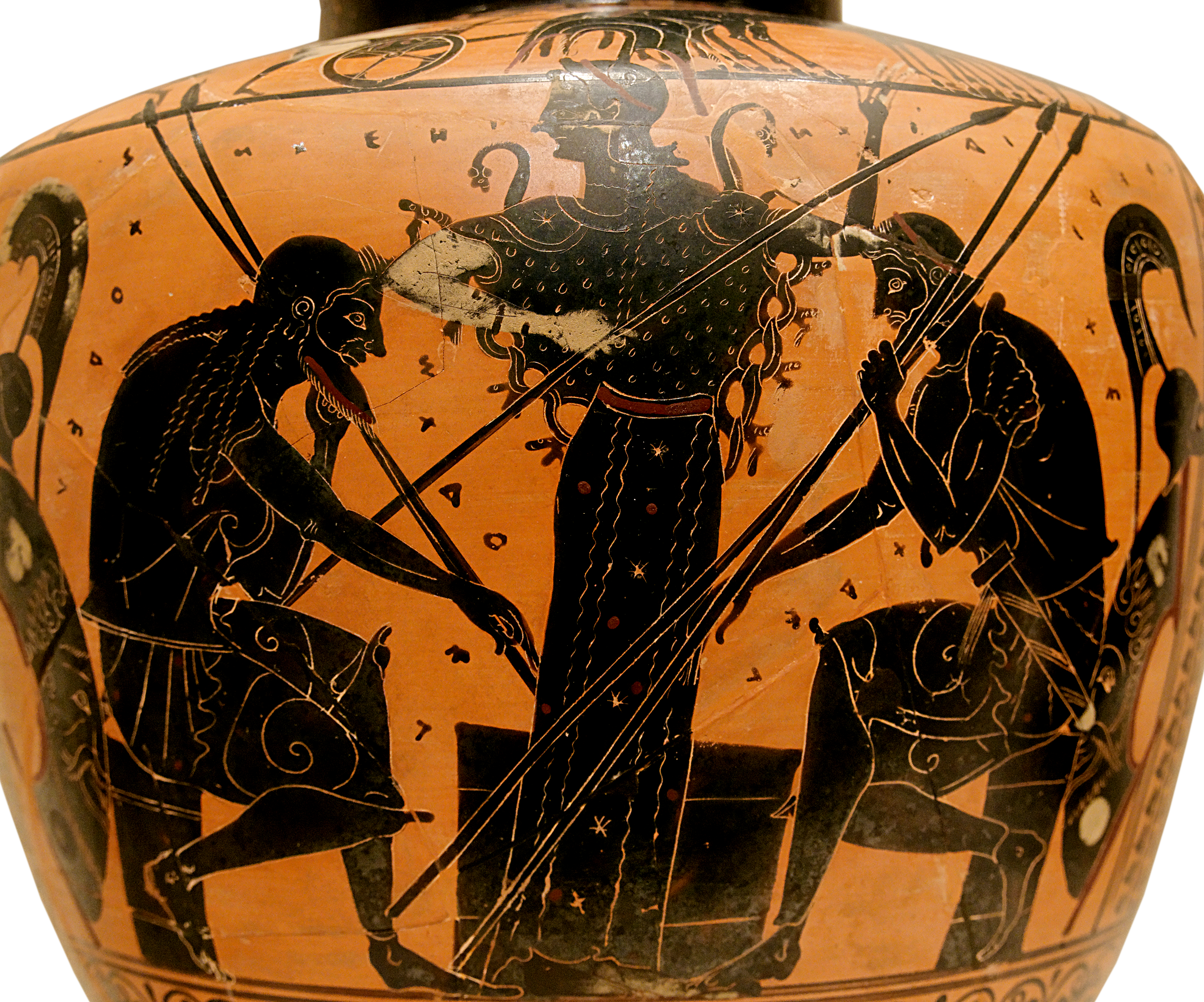
In the genre scene of Achilles and Ajax playing dice, here with Athena presiding, the heroes often hold two spears (Attic black-figure hydria, ca. 510 BCE BC)

The dory was about 2–3 meters in length (6'7" in. to 9'10” in.) and had a handle with a diameter of 5 cm (2 in) made of wood, either cornel or ash weighing 0.91 to 1.81 kg (2.0 to 4.0 lb). The flat leaf-shaped spearhead was made of iron and its weight was counterbalanced by an iron butt-spike. (cf Sarissa)

The point part of the spear was called αἰχμή and ἀκωκή and λόγχη.

The rear of the spear was capped with a spike called a sauroter (Greek: σαυρωτήρ or σαυροτήρ). It was also called ouriachos (οὐρίαχος) and styrax (στύραξ) or styrakion (στυράκιον). It functionally served as a counter-weight to give balance. This spike had several uses. It could be used to stand the spear up or used as a secondary weapon if the spearhead was broken off. If the shaft of the dory was broken or if the iron point was lost, the remaining portion could still function. Though its combat range would be reduced, the dory's complete length would have lessened the chance of a single break rendering it ineffective. Additionally, any enemies that had fallen could be dispatched by the warriors marching over them in the back ranks of the phalanx who were holding their spears in a vertical position.

A dory was kept in a case which was called δορατοθήκη or δουροδοθήκη or δουροθήκη or δοροθήκη (meaning "dory case") and δουροδόκη or δορυδόκη (meaning "dory rack"). Homer called it σύριγξ, meaning pipe because of the form of the case.

== See also ==
- Xyston
