= Lene Rubinstein =

British historian of ancient Greece

Lene Rubinstein is Professor of Ancient History at Royal Holloway, University of London. Her research centres on Greek history, especially Ancient Greek law and Greek inscriptions, as well as the Attic orators and oratory generally.

== Education and career ==
She was educated at the University of Copenhagen and the University of Cambridge. She was a member of the Copenhagen Polis Centre 1993-2004, with contributions on the poleis of Ionia and Aiolis in Asia Minor. She is co-founder and co-director of the Centre for Oratory and Rhetoric at the Department of History and Classics. She has published on Athenian and Hellenistic law, Greek oratory and interstate relations, and she is the author of Adoption in IV Century Athens, Copenhagen 1993, and Litigation and Cooperation: Supporting Speakers in the Courts of Classical Athens, Stuttgart 2000, on advocacy in the Athenian courts.

== Selected publications ==
- Aegean Networks: Dissemination of Legal Culture from the Archaic to the Classical Period, in Symposion 2024, Verlag der Österreichischen Akademie der Wissenschaften, 2026
- Collective Guilt and Collective Punishment, Individual Responsibility, and Obedience to the Laws, in Classica et Mediaevalia Suppl. 4, 2026
- Abolition of Laws, Constitutional Change, and Emergency Legislation, in Symposion 2022, Verlag der Österreichischen Akademie der Wissenschaften, 2024
- Immigration and Refugee Crises in Fourth-Century Greece: An Athenian Perspective, The European Legacy, 2018
- Summary fines in Greek inscriptions and the question of Greek Law, in Greek Law in the 21st Century, Austin TX: University of Texas Press, 2018
- Communal Revenge and Appeals to Dicastic Emotions, in Unveiling Emotions II, Franz Steiner Verlag, 2016.
- Envoys and Ethos: team speaking by envoys in Classical Greece, in La rhetorique du pouvoir, Vandoeuvres: Entretiens du Fondation Hardt, 2016.
- Clauses out of Context: Partial Citation of Statutes in Attic Forensic Oratory, in Use and Abuse of Law in the Athenian Courts, Brill 2016.
- Profession and Performance: Aspects of Oratory in the Greco-Roman World, Kremmydas, C. (ed.), Rubinstein, L. (ed.) & Powell, J. (ed.) 11 Oct 2013 London: Institute of Classical Studies. (Bulletin of the Institute of Classical Studies Supplement; vol. 123)
- Forgive and forget? Amnesty in the Hellenistic period, in Vergeben und Vergessen? Amnestie in der Antike, Holzhausen 2013.
- Spoken words, written submissions, and diplomatic conventions: The importance and impact of oral performance in Hellenistic inter-polis relations, in Hellenistic Oratory: Continuity and Change, 2013.
- Greek History and Epigraphy: Essays in Honour of P. J. Rhodes, Rubinstein, L. (ed.) & Mitchell, L. (ed.) 2009 Swansea: Classical Press of Wales.
- The Law and the Courts in Ancient Greece, Rubinstein, L. (ed.) & Harris, E. (ed.) 2004 London: Duckworth.
- Litigation and Co-operation. The use of supporting speakers in the Courts of Classical Athens, Rubinstein, L. 2000 Stuttgart: F. Steiner Verlag. (Historia Einzelschriften; vol. 147)
- Polis and Politics, Rubinstein, L. (ed.), Nielsen, T. H. (ed.) & Flensted-Jensen, P. (ed.) 2000 Copenhagen: Museum Tusculanum, University of Copenhagen.
- Adoption in IV. Century Athens, Rubinstein, L. 1993 Copenhagen: Museum Tusculanum, University of Copenhagen. (Opuscula Graecolatina; vol. 34)
