= Promachos =

- πρόμαχος
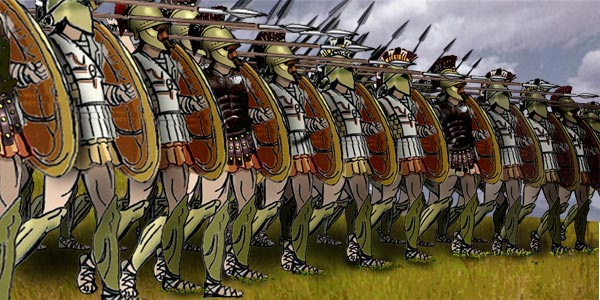
- Promachos in a Greek phalanx
- Country: Ancient Greece
- Type: Front-rank soldier in a phalanx

In ancient Greece and during the Byzantine era, the Promachoi (singular: Promachos; Greek: πρόμαχος) were the men fighting in the first rank of the phalanx. The word can also be used as an adjective as in "promachos line" referring to the first line of battle.

The first use of the word is recorded in Homer's Iliad. An obsolete English literal translation of promachos is forefighter, in Dutch voorvechter.

== Name ==
- Promachos (Πρόμαχος), a young man from Knossos.

== Sanctuaries - Statues ==
- Athena Promachos, the famous bronze statue by Phidias that towered over the Parthenon.
- Hermes Promachos, a sanctuary at Tanagra was dedicated to him.
- Heracles Promachos, a white marble statue of Heracles in the Heracles Sanctuary at Thebes. The Thebans Xenocrites (Ξενοκρίτης) and Eubius (Εὔβιος) created the statue.
