= Edmund Lammert =

German philologist (1847–1921)

Ludwig Theodor Edmund Lammert (10 June 1847–21 September 1921) was a German classical philologist.

== Biography ==
Edmund Lammert was born on 10 June 1847 in Sondershausen. He attended the Sondershausen gymnasium (high school) from 1864 to 1868. Lammert studied classical philology at Leipzig University, albeit interrupted by a year of military service during the Franco-Prussian War (1870–71). He returned to his studies in the summer of 1871 and received his doctorate in 1874 with his dissertation De pronominibus relativis Homericis. His professors and influences included Friedrich Ritschl, Georg Curtius, and Ludwig Lange.

After graduation, Lammert stayed in Leipzig, where he worked as a teacher at the Königlichen Gymnasium, later known as König-Albert-Gymnasium. He continued his philology work and scholarship, writing treatises and articles on Greek and Roman history and philology, including articles in the prestigious Realencyclopädie der classischen Altertumswissenschaft. He would live in Leipzig the rest of his life, dying there on 21 September 1921.

In 1887, his daughter Luise Lammert was born, who would go on to become a notable meteorologist.

== Selected works ==
- De pronominibus relativis Homericis (1874) (ebook)
- Polybios und die römische Taktik (1889) (ebook)
