= Sarissa =

Long spear used by Macedonian army

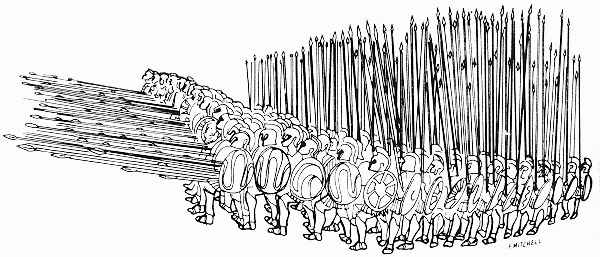
Macedonian phalanx

The sarissa or sarisa (Note: Ancient Greeks used both the σάρισα (sarisa) and the σάρισσα (sarissa) form when spelling the word in Koine Greek.) was a long spear or pike about 5 to 7 meters (16 to 23 ft) in length. It was introduced by Philip II of Macedon and was used in his Macedonian phalanxes as a replacement for the earlier dory, which was considerably shorter. These longer spears improved the strength of the phalanx by extending the rows of overlapping weapons projecting towards the enemy. After the conquests of Alexander the Great, the sarissa was a mainstay during the Hellenistic era (4th–1st centuries BCE) by the Hellenistic armies of the diadochi Greek successor states of Alexander's empire, as well as some of their rivals.

== Composition and utility ==
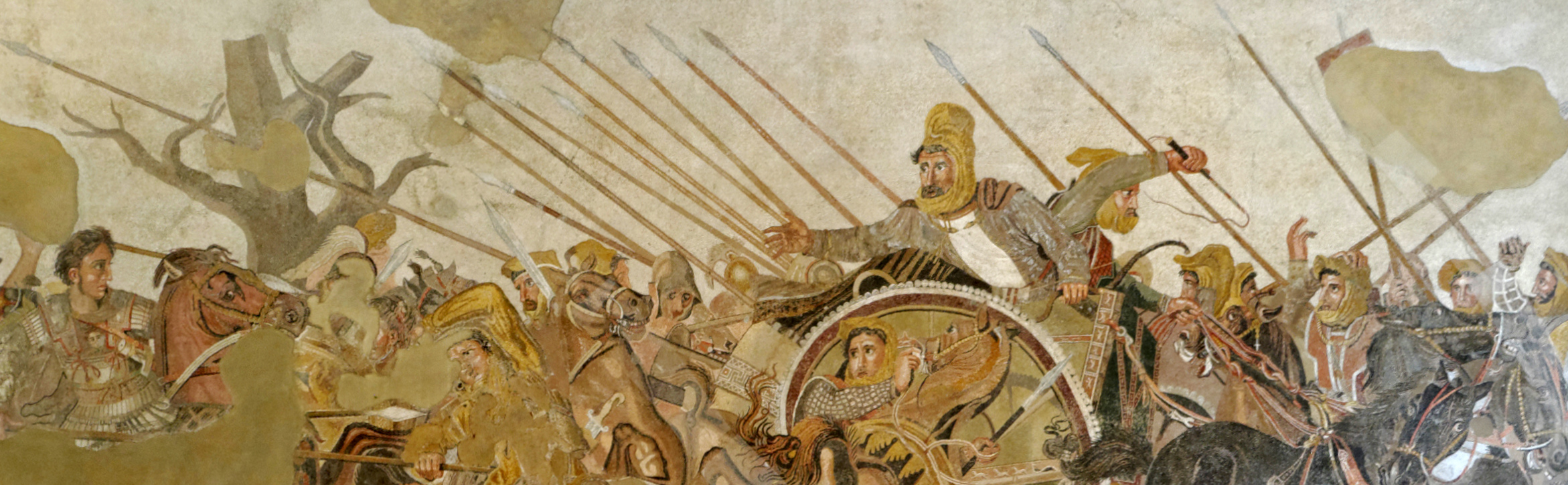
The Alexander Mosaic, a surviving ancient artistic depiction that probably depicts massed sarissas.

The sarissa is made of two core parts: a long wooden shaft and a metal tip. A third part that may have existed for some sarissas was a metal spear-butt at the reverse end. The metal butt of the sarissa could be used to safely stow it in the ground without damaging the shaft when not in use.

Two types of wood are favored as likely candidates for the shaft: ash wood combines length, flexibility, and being lightweight, while cornel wood is shorter but stronger. (Note: Both ash and cornel wood were easily available in Macedonia and the Near East. The sarissa being made of ash is supported by ancient sources and historians such as Edmund Lammert, Anthony Snodgrass, and Nicholas Victor Sekunda. The other possibility is that resilient cornel (also known as cornelian cherry) was used instead, based on Theophratus's writings, and is favored by historians such as Robin Lane Fox, Minor Markle, and Peter Connolly. Cornel is stronger and tougher, but does not grow as long, suggesting either shorter sarissas or some kind of combination shaft hewed from multiple lumber strands.) The shaft was probably slightly tapered, narrowing somewhat toward the end. The size of the tip is disputed; much scholarship from 1970–2000 favored a comparatively large and heavy spearhead shaped like a leaf on the basis of an archaeological find by Manolis Andronikos of such an implement in a Macedonian tomb at Vergina, 51 cm (1.67 ft) long. 21st-century scholarship has been more skeptical this was really a sarissa head that was found. (Note: The leaf-shaped chunk of iron found by Andronikos at Vergina was a hefty 1.235 kg (2.72 lb). Peter Connolly writes that this was more likely a spear butt rather than a spearhead, while Nicholas Victor Sekunda suggests that it was a spearhead, but one used only on ceremonial spears meant as a badge of rank (similar to the later use of spontoons as symbols of authority), perhaps by royal somatophylakes ("bodyguards") given that the wielder apparently merited a tomb. Connolly also writes that smaller spearheads were found at Vergina as well, and that these smaller spearheads should be taken as the default form.) Nicholas Victor Sekunda favors the metal tip being smaller at around 13.5 cm (5.3 in), made of iron, and diamond shaped. Ancient writers say that the sarissa was capable of piercing both shield and armor, which suggests to Sekunda the use of a small but focused spearhead rather than a broad one. Additionally, the Alexander Mosaic seems to show small spearheads, and small spearheads match what later medieval pikemen found to work the best.

Ancient authorities are unanimous in saying the sarissa was distinguished by its great length, which made it difficult for opposing soldiers to safely engage phalangites. Exactly how long this length was is less clear, as different authors give varying descriptions, ancient units of measurement were not always consistent nor precise, and the wood used to create the Hellenistic sarissas has long since rotted away making archaeological evidence lacking. Many historians consider Polybius the most trustworthy account, as he had actual experience with observing the Hellenistic phalanx and his accounts are accurate elsewhere. Polybius writes that "the length of the sarissae is sixteen cubits according to the original design, which has been reduced in practice to fourteen," presumably referring to the 2nd century BCE Antigonid Macedonian sarissa in context. The second most compelling surviving account is from Theophrastus, writing in the late 4th century BCE and early 3rd century BCE, who lived during the time of Alexander the Great. Theophrastus, in an off-hand remark in Enquiry into Plants, mentions that the longest sarissa was 12 cubits long. Based on this, many historians have assumed that both accounts were basically correct, and that the sarissa grew longer during the post-Alexander Hellenistic era from the 12 cubits Theophrastus reports to the 14 cubits that Polybius observed. However, other historians have offered different theories; Peter Connolly suggests that the lengths were basically the same. Converted to modern units, this suggests around 5.8 m (19 ft) for the sarissa in the time of Alexander in the 4th century BCE, and around 6.3 m (21 ft) if the 3rd–1st century BCE sarissas really did become even longer.

In the scholarship based on Andronikos' discoveries and his and Markle's journal articles, it is thought that the sarissa was heavy for a spear, weighing approximately 5.5 to 6.5 kg (12 to 14 lb). (Note: Although in terms of total equipment weight, a Hellenistic soldier's kit may still have been lighter than a Roman soldier's, which is estimated at not less than 20 kg (44 lb)) Later reconstructions have suggested that this was too heavy—Peter Connolly was able to reconstruct an infantry spear 5.8 meters long of cherry wood that weighed only 4.05 kg (9 lb), and an ash-wood spear would have been even lighter.

One possibility considered by some scholars is that to make such prodigiously long pikes, two separate tree branches were joined by a metal tube. This theory rested on the identification of such a tube in Andronikos's Vergina finds as perhaps being the middle part of a sarissa, along with cornel wood being difficult to grow out to the longest lengths described. This theory has largely been discarded, though, as making an unwieldy weapon that is likely to break.

=== Shields ===
Infantry sarissa wielders in a phalanx generally also used a shield. An inscription in the Lindian Temple Chronicle records a gift of "ten peltai, ten sarisai, and ten helmets" dedicated to King Philip V of Macedon, suggesting that the Macedonians viewed the sarissa and the bronze pelta (shield) as a matched set. The bulk and size of the sarissa required soldiers to wield it with both hands, allowing them to carry only a smaller shield. The pelta was perhaps around 60 cm (24 in) in size in Alexander's era, and perhaps only 45 cm (18 in) by the Hellenistic era if even longer sarissas were really used then. To make it easier to carry when both hands were occupied, a neck strap may have been used to help hold the shield and cover the left shoulder. However, other scholars suggest that larger shields were used in the Macedonian phalanx, ranging from 65 to 75 cm (26 to 30 in). Some light-infantry peltasts in the Antigonid army appear to have been closer to a more mobile phalanx than the Alexander-era skirmishers, and they may have used a combination of smaller shields along with smaller sarissas to improve their mobility.

=== Cavalry version ===
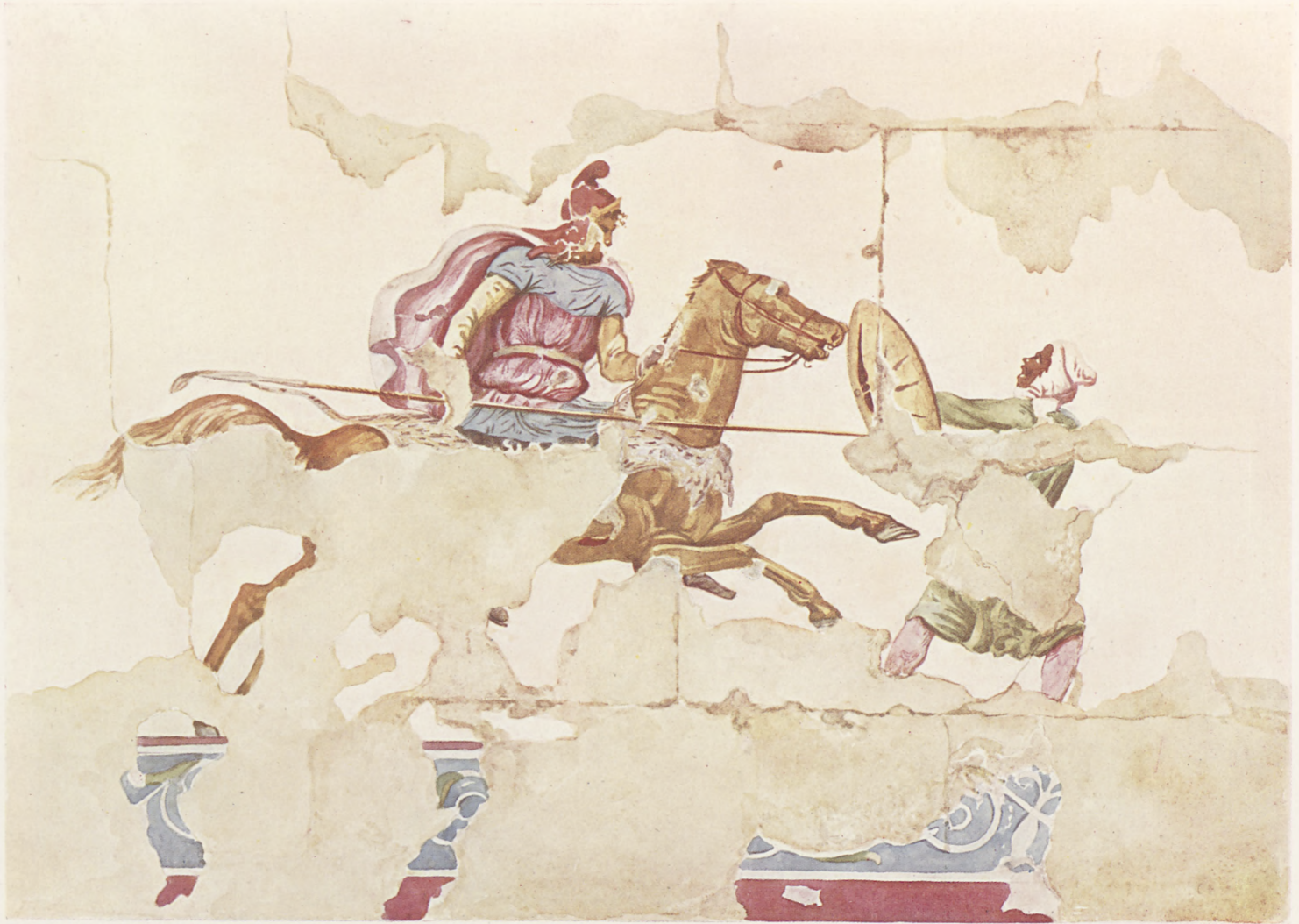
A painting of a Macedonian cavalryman possibly wielding the cavalry version of a sarissa (~3rd century BCE; published by K. F. Kinch). The depiction shows what is either a metal spear-butt at the end, or another spear head for a double weapon.

The Macedonian army of Alexander's time featured a unit of light cavalry (prodromoi) called the sarissophoroi who also wielded sarissas, albeit somewhat shorter versions. However, the term "sarissophoroi" eventually stops showing up in literature in the later Hellenistic age. Most surviving depictions of Macedonian cavalry depict it wielded under-arm, but it probably could have been wielded over-arm as well.

Minor Markle thought that based on ancient depictions, the cavalry sarissa would have been about 4.5 m (15 ft). He also does not think that the cavalry always equipped themselves with sarissas; for scouting missions, they probably just carried two javelins and a sword instead, reserving the sarissa for use in major battles. Peter Connolly also researched the matter. Connolly wrote that the cavalry spear was depicted as a primary weapon (rather than a Roman pilum which could be thrown once, like a javelin) and thus should be able to be used repeatedly. Connolly arranged for a modern horse rider to test out reconstructed spears of several of the possible lengths, and found it plausible that a cavalry spear as long as 4.9 m (16 ft) could have been used. He thought that tactically, the longer (4.5 meters+) version would make for a more devastating initial charge, but that a 4.0 m (13.1 ft) spear would be easier to use in a prolonged melee. Both Markle and Connolly write that the cavalry sarissa, unlike the infantry sarissa, was almost certainly wielded one-handed, as a full heavy two-handed impact would probably knock the sarissa-wielding rider off their own horse.

While Hellenistic cavalry frequently wielded spears, whether their weapon is best classed as a shorter version of the sarissa or as a xyston (Ancient Greek: ξυστόν) is disputed. Nicholas Victor Sekunda argues that the Macedonian cavalry spear was more properly classed as a xyston. The xyston was made of cornel wood, was shorter than an infantry sarissa, and had a larger and wider spearhead than the infantry sarissa. He also notes that Ancient Macedonians may have used the term "sarissa" broadly in the sense of any spear, even if other Greeks meant specifically the Macedonian variety.

== Tactics ==
The standard Hellenistic army deployment was to have a heavy infantry phalanx in the center, cavalry on the sides capable of threatening to flank the enemy or to attack weak spots, and light infantry skirmishers such as slingers or javelineers in the front. Of these, the infantry phalanxes wielded sarissas, and the cavalry wielded somewhat shorter spears, which may or may not have qualified as a "sarissa".

While marching and maneuvering, infantry sarissas were held vertically. Once the sarissas were leveled (that is, pointed horizontally forward for battle), the phalanx could advance straight forward, but turning the phalanx was more difficult and required training and discipline. The sarissa was already so long that thrusting them forward likely did not extend their range much, comparatively — perhaps around an additional 0.5 m (1.6 ft).

The sarissa-bearing phalanx usually marched to battle in open formation to facilitate movement. Before the charge, it tightened its files to close formation or even compact formation (synaspismos). The tight formation of the phalanx created a "wall of pikes", and the pike was so long that there were fully five rows of them projecting in front of the front rank of men—even if an enemy got past the first row, there were still four more to stop him. The back rows bore their pikes angled upwards in readiness, which served the additional purpose of deflecting incoming arrows.

The Macedonian phalanx was considered practically invulnerable from the front. Another phalanx could perhaps wear a phalanx down in a long battle from exhaustion, but this was far from guaranteed. The best way to defeat one was generally by one of a loss of morale from killing the enemy commander, breaking its formation, or outflanking it. For example, the Romans used a flanking tactic at the Battle of Cynoscephalae (197 BC) to defeat the Antigonid Macedonians. A few years later, the Seleucid phalanx held up well at the Battle of Thermopylae (191 BCE); a Roman surprise flanking force caused the army to lose formation and retreat. Livy writes on the Roman victory at the Battle of Pydna (168 BCE) against the Antigonid Macedonian army that:

Its force, while it is compact and bristling with extended spears, is irresistible; but if, by attacking them separately, you force them to turn about their spears, which, on account of their length and weight, are unwieldy, they are mingled in a confused mass; and, if any disorder arises on the flank or rear, they fall into irretrievable disorder. (...) had [the Romans] advanced with their entire line, straight against the phalanx when in its regular order, just as happened to the Pelignians, who, in the beginning of the battle, incautiously engaged the targeteers; they would have impaled themselves on the spears, and would have been unable to withstand such a firm body.

— Livy, The History of Rome, 44.41

One possible technique that could have been used with a sarissa is planting them directly in the ground if an enemy charge was thought to be imminent. However, the only source that reports this tactic is the satirist Lucian of Samosata, writing centuries after the sarissa's prominence, so if it was a real technique, it seems to have been a rare one.

Phalangites carried a backup weapon, generally a sword or dagger. If a phalanx broke formation, or if a lone soldier found himself in close combat, the sarissa was nearly useless as a weapon, and the backup weapon was used instead.

== History of use ==
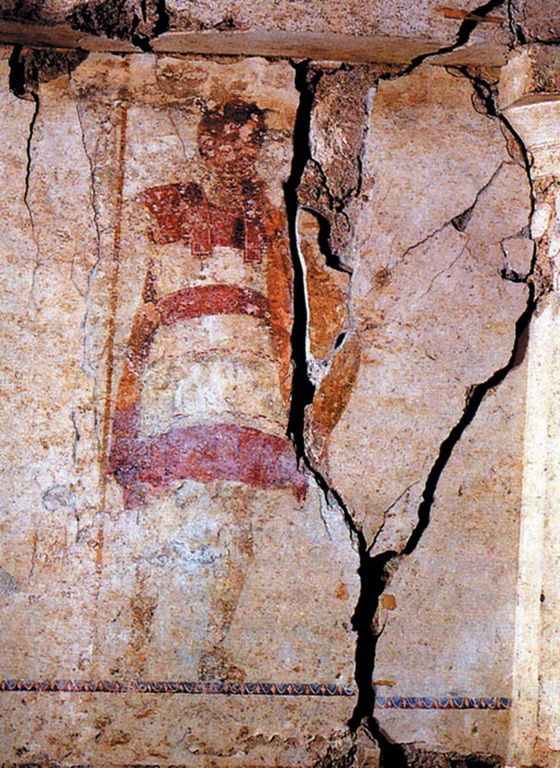
3rd century BCE art of a warrior carrying a spear from the Tomb of Judgement, Lefkadia—possibly a sarissa

The adoption of the sarissa by the Macedonian infantry is usually credited to Philip II, father of Alexander the Great. Alexander used the sarissa armed phalanx in his wars across Asia, where he conquered Asia Minor, Persian Egypt, the Persian Empire's homelands in Babylonia and Persia, and the Pauravas (northwest India). The sarissa-wielding phalanxes were vital in every early battle, including the pivotal Battle of Gaugamela where the Persian king's scythe chariots were utterly destroyed by the phalanx, supported by the combined use of companion cavalry and peltasts (javelineers). During his later campaigning, Alexander gradually reduced the importance of the phalanx and the sarissa, as he modified his combined use of arms to incorporate Asian weapons and troops, not specifically trained in Macedonian battle tactics.

The sarissa remained the core of Hellenistic armies of the Diadochi successor states to Alexander's empire.

The word remained in use throughout the Byzantine years to sometimes describe the long spears of their own infantry. Long pikes eventually came back into vogue due to changing circumstances in the late medieval and early modern period (~1300–1700); scholars of military history have used reports of how Swiss mercenaries, German Landsknecht, and English and Irish pikemen fought to analyze how the similar Macedonian sarissa was likely used. In his 1521 book The Art of War, Niccolo Machiavelli wrote that "I conjecture that a Macedonian Phalanx was nothing else than a battalion of Swiss is today, who have all their strength and power in their pikes." Preserved English pikes from this period tend to be 5.6 to 5.9 meters (18 to 19 ft) long, and there are reports of pikes as long as 6.7 m (22 ft). These reports suggest that usage of such long pikes by the Macedonians was plausible and militarily viable.

== See also ==
- Polearm

== Bibliography ==
- Campbell, Duncan B. (2014). "How long was the Macedonian sarissa?". Ancient Warfare. VIII (3). Karwansaray Publishers: 48–52.
- Connolly, Peter (2002). "Experiments with the sarissa – the Macedonian pike and cavalry lance – a functional view". Journal of Roman Military Equipment Studies. 11 2000: 103–112. ISSN 0961-3684.
- Fox, Robin Lane (1973). Alexander the Great. Penguin. ISBN 0-14-008878-4.
- Markle, Minor M. (1977). "The Macedonian Sarrissa, Spear and Related Armor". American Journal of Archaeology. 81 (3). Archaeological Institute of America: 323–339. doi:10.2307/503007. JSTOR 503007. S2CID 192966553.
- Markle, Minor M. (1978). "Use of the Sarissa by Philip and Alexander of Macedon". American Journal of Archaeology. 82 (4): 483–497. doi:10.2307/504637. JSTOR 504637.
- Markle, Minor M. (1982). "Macedonian Arms and Tactics under Alexander the Great". In Barr-Sharrar, Beryl (ed.). Macedonia and Greece in Late Classical and Early Hellenistic Times. Studies in the History of Art Symposium Series I. Vol. 10. Washington, DC: National Gallery of Art. pp. 86–111. JSTOR 42617923.
- Lammert, Edmund (1920). "Sarisse". Realencyclopädie der classischen Altertumswissenschaft (in German). Vol. IA2. pp. 2515–2530.
- Sekunda, Nicholas Victor (2001). "The Sarissa". Acta Universitatis Lodziensis. Folia Archaeologica. 1 (23): 13–41. doi:10.18778/0208-6034.23.1.02.
- Sekunda, Nicholas Victor (2013). The Antigonid Army. Akanthina No. 8. Gdańsk: University of Gdańsk. ISBN 978-83-7531-266-9.
