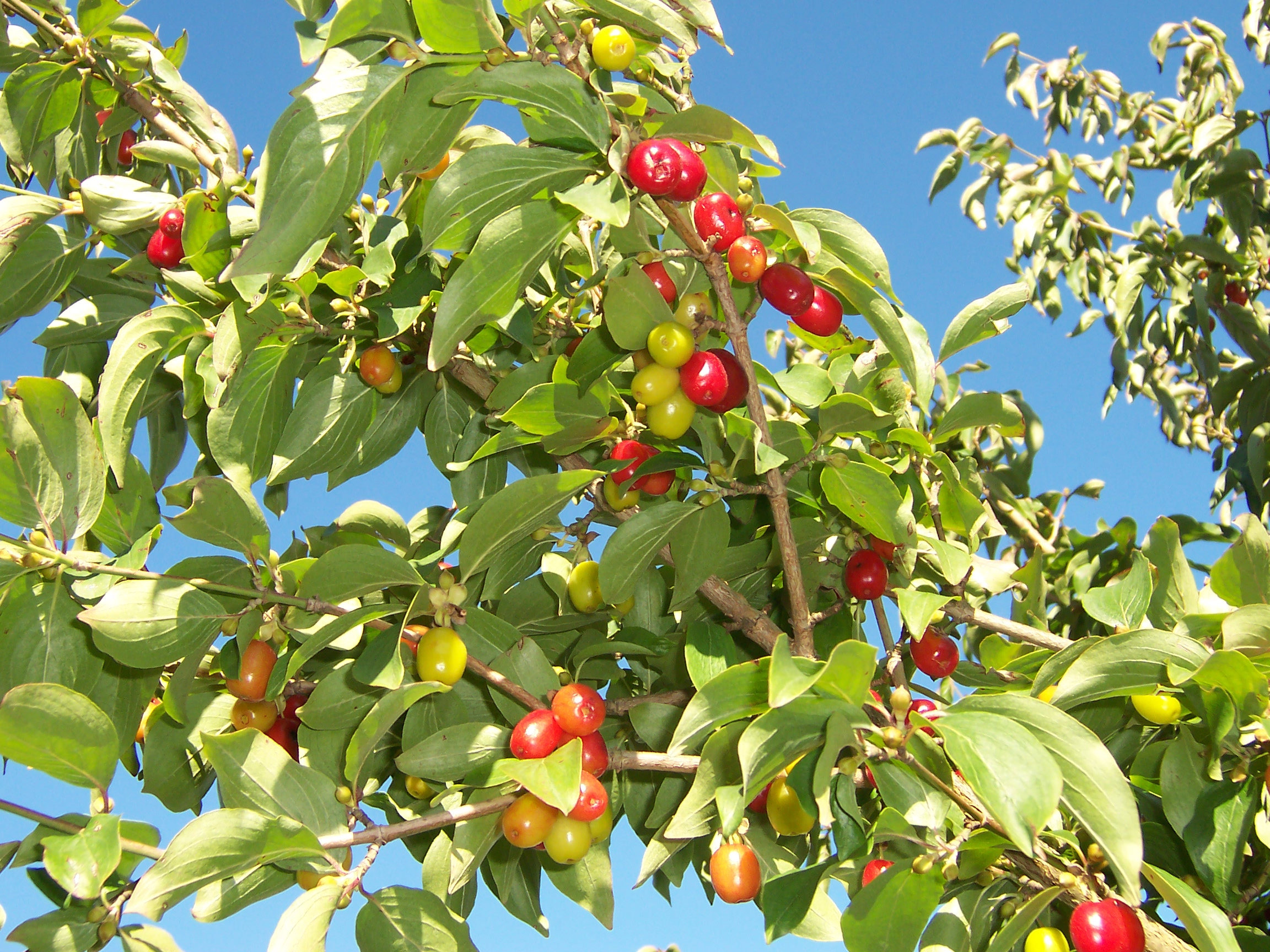

Scientific classification
- Kingdom: Plantae
- Clade: Embryophytes
- Clade: Tracheophytes
- Clade: Angiosperms
- Clade: Eudicots
- Clade: Asterids
- Order: Cornales
- Family: Cornaceae
- Genus: Cornus
- Subgenus: Cornus subg. Cornus
- Species: C. mas

Binomial name
- Cornus mas L.
- Distribution map

Synonyms
- Synonymy: Cornus erythrocarpa St.-Lag.; Cornus flava Steud.; Cornus homerica Bubani; Cornus mascula L.; Cornus nudiflora Dumort.; Cornus praecox Stokes; Cornus vernalis Salisb.; Eukrania mascula (L.) Merr.; Macrocarpium mas (L.) Nakai

= Cornus mas =

Cornelian cherry

Species of flowering plant

Cornelian cherry (Cornus mas), also known as the European cornel, is a species of shrub or small tree in the dogwood family Cornaceae native to Western Europe, Southern Europe, and Southwestern Asia.

== Description ==
It is a medium to large deciduous shrub or small tree growing to 5–12 m (16–39 ft) tall, with dark brown branches and greenish twigs. The leaves are opposite, 4–10 cm (1.6–3.9 in) long and 2–4 cm (0.8–1.6 in) broad, with an ovate to oblong shape and an entire margin. The flowers are small (5–10 mm in diameter), with four yellow petals, produced in clusters of 10–25 together in the late winter (between February and March in the UK), well before the leaves appear. The fruit is an oblong red drupe 2 cm long and 1.5 cm in diameter, containing a single seed.

== Name ==
Cornus mas, "male" cornel, was named so to distinguish it from the true dogberry, the "female" cornel, Cornus sanguinea, and so it appears in John Gerard's Herbal:

This is Cornus mas Theophrasti, or Theophrastus his male Cornell tree; for he ſetteth downe two ſortes of Cornell trees, the male and the female: he maketh the wood of the male to bee ſound as in this Cornell tree; which we both for this cauſe and for others alſo, haue made to be the male; the female is that which is commonly called Virga ſanguinea, or Dogs berrie tree, and Cornus ſylveſtris, or the wild Cornell tree, of which alſo we will intreate of in the next chap. following.

== Cultivation ==
The shrub was not native to the British Isles. William Turner had only heard of the plant in 1548, but by 1551 he had heard of one at Hampton Court Palace. Gerard said it was to be found in the gardens "of such as love rare and dainty plants".

The appreciation of the early acid-yellow flowers is largely a 20th-century development.

=== Cultivars ===
The following cultivars have gained the Royal Horticultural Society's Award of Garden Merit (confirmed 2017):

- 'Aurea' (yellow leaves and flowers, red fruit)
- 'Golden Glory' (profuse yellow flowers, shiny red berries)
- 'Variegata' (variegated leaves, glossy red fruit)

== Uses ==
=== Fruit ===
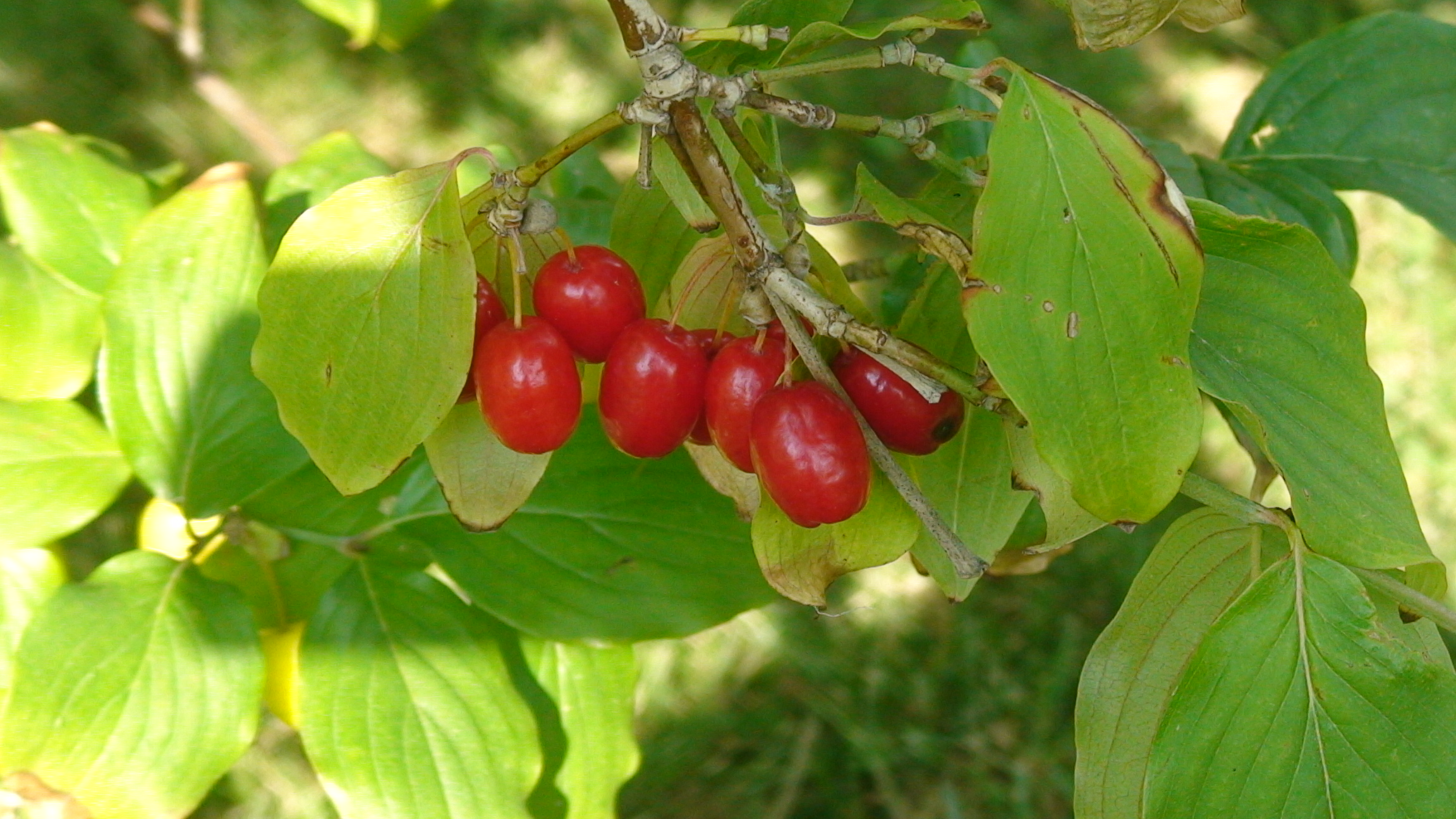
Leaves and berries

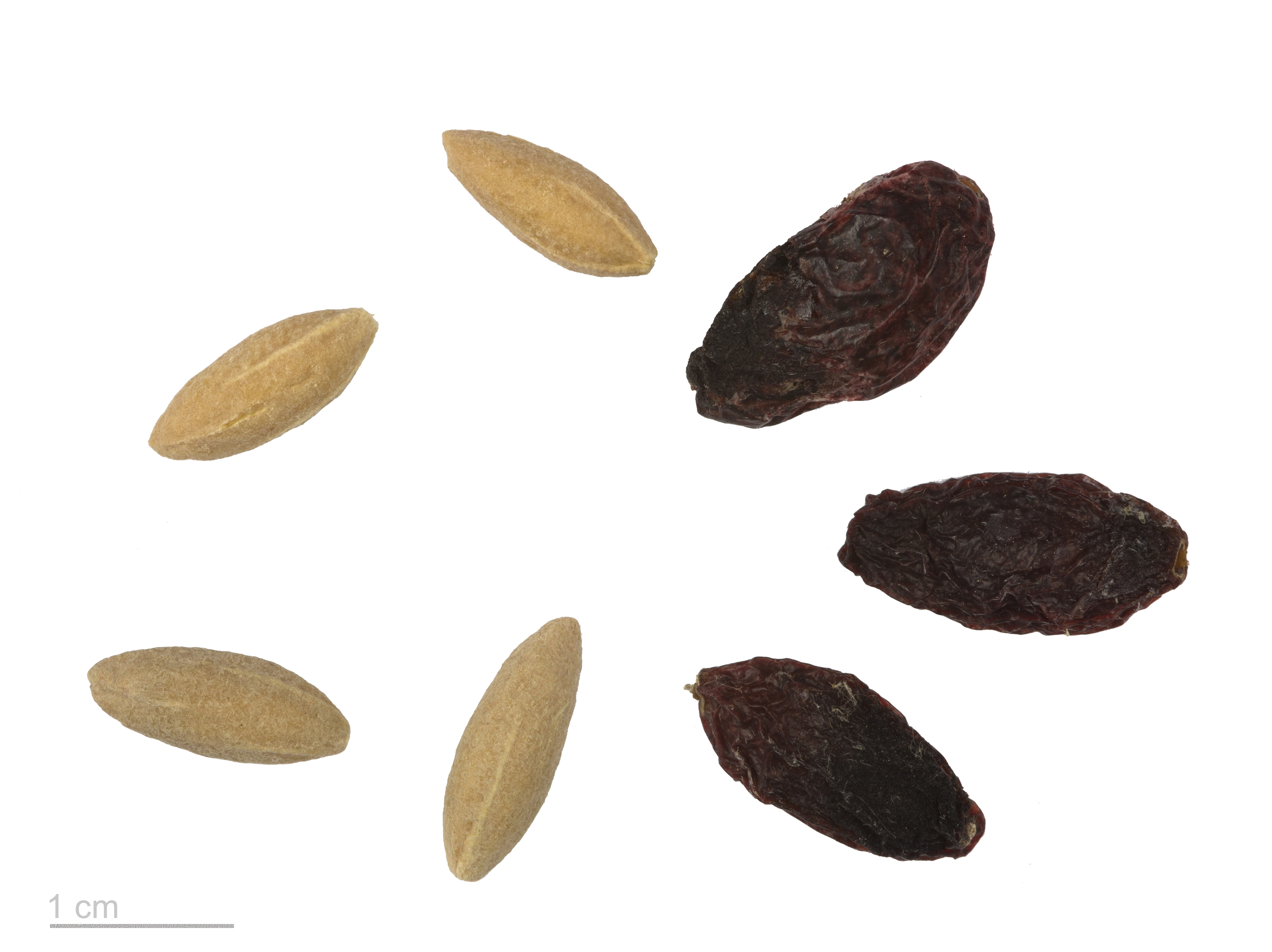
Seeds and dried fruit – MHNT

The fruits are red berries. When ripe on the plant, they bear a resemblance to coffee berries, and ripen in mid- to late summer. The fruit is edible and widely known in Iran, where it is believed to have medicinal properties and provide health benefits. It is also used in Eastern Europe, the UK, and British Columbia, Canada, but the unripe fruit is astringent. When ripe, the fruit is dark ruby-red or a bright yellow. It has an acidic flavor which is best described as a mixture of cranberry and sour cherry. It is mainly used for making jam. It is widely used in Azerbaijan to make pickles or beverages or to add to rice. In Armenia, Cornus berries are used to make vodka. In Romania and Moldova, the berries are used to make an alcoholic beverage known as cornată. In Bulgaria the berries are widely used to make kompot. In Iran, the fresh fruit is common as a summer refreshment or as an infusion in araq (raisin vodka). It is also preserved by drying and salting, or made into fruit leather or paste, which are enjoyed as a children's treat or used as a sour seasoning, similar to plum, pomegranate and tamarind.

The fruit of Cornus mas (together with the fruit of C. officinalis) has a history of use in traditional Chinese medicine in which it is known as shānzhūyú (山茱萸) and used to retain the jing.

=== Flowers ===
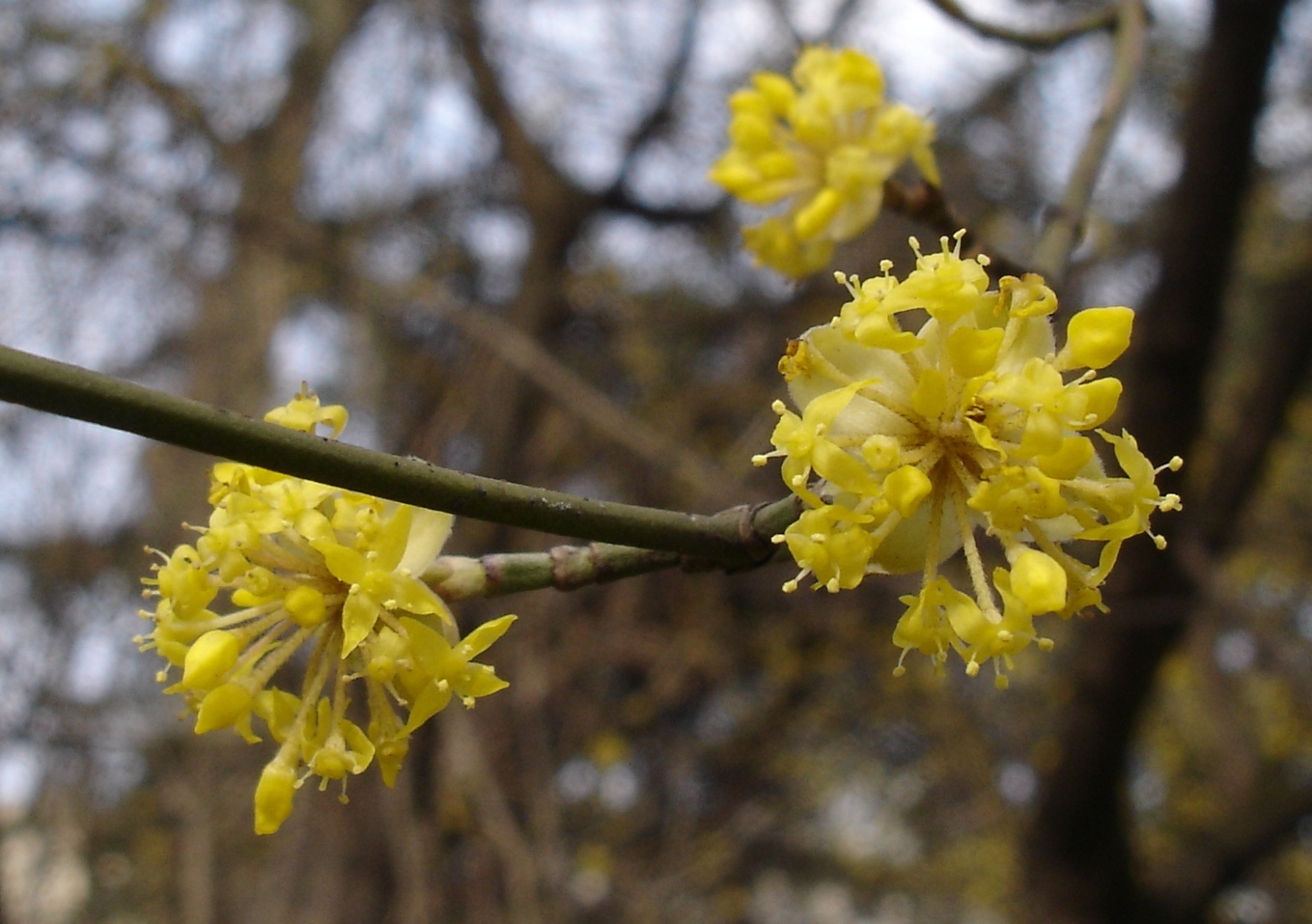
Flowers

The species is also grown as an ornamental plant for its late winter yellow flowers, which open earlier than those of Forsythia. While Cornus mas flowers are not as large and vibrant as those of the Forsythia, the entire plant can be used for a similar effect in the landscape.

=== Wood ===
The wood of C. mas is extremely dense and, unlike the wood of most other woody plant species, sinks in water. This density makes it valuable for crafting into tool handles or parts for machines.

Cornus mas was used from the seventh century BCE onward by Greek craftsmen to construct spears, javelins and bows, as a material far superior to any other wood. It was also used by the Kingdom of Macedon under Phillip II and later Alexander the Great as the primary material for the sarissa used by their infantry soldiers. The wood's association with weaponry was so well known that the Greek name for it was used as a synonym for "spear" in poetry during the fourth and third centuries BCE.

In Italy, the mazzarella, uncino or bastone, the stick carried by the butteri or mounted herdsmen of the Maremma region, is traditionally made of cornel-wood, there called crognolo or grugnale, dialect forms of Italian: corniolo.

=== Leaves ===
The leaves (and fruit) are used in traditional medicine in Central and Southwest Asia.
