= Government of Macedonia (ancient kingdom) =

Political history topic

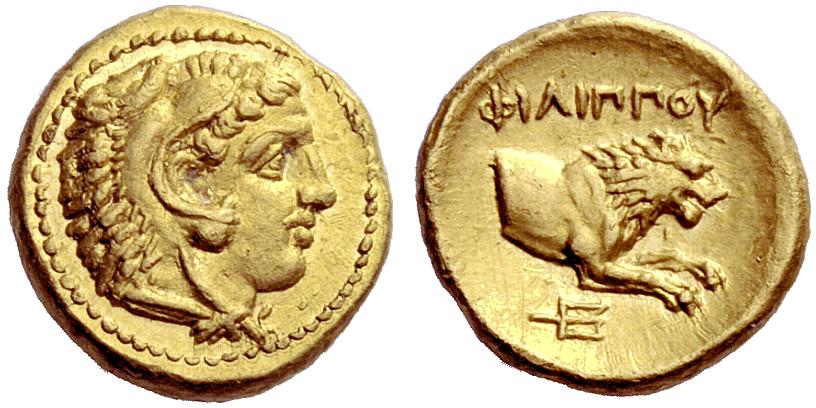
A gold half stater of Philip II of Macedon produced at the government mint of Pella, bearing the head of a young Heracles wearing the Nemean Lion's skin on the obverse and on the reverse the lion's forepart

The first government of ancient Macedonia was established by the Argead dynasty of Macedonian kings during the Archaic period (8th–5th centuries BC). The early history of the ancient kingdom of Macedonia is obscure because of shortcomings in the historical record; little is known of governmental institutions before the reign of Philip II during the late Classical period (480–336 BC). These bureaucratic organizations evolved in complexity under his successor Alexander the Great and the subsequent Antipatrid and Antigonid dynasties of Hellenistic Greece (336–146 BC). Following the Roman victory in the Third Macedonian War over Perseus of Macedon in 168 BC, the Macedonian monarchy was abolished and replaced by four client state republics. After a brief revival of the monarchy in 150–148 BC, the Fourth Macedonian War resulted in another Roman victory and the establishment of the Roman province of Macedonia.

It is unclear if there was a formally established constitution dictating the laws, organization, and divisions of power in ancient Macedonia's government, although some tangential evidence suggests this. The king (basileus) served as the head of state and was assisted by his noble companions and royal pages. Kings served as the chief judges of the kingdom, although little is known about Macedonia's judiciary. The kings were also expected to serve as high priests of the nation, using their wealth to sponsor various religious cults. The Macedonian kings had command over certain natural resources such as gold from mining and timber from logging. The right to mint gold, silver, and bronze coins was shared by the central and local governments.

The Macedonian kings served as the commanders-in-chief of Macedonia's armed forces, while it was common for them to personally lead troops into battle. Surviving textual evidence suggests that the ancient Macedonian army exercised its authority in matters such as the royal succession when there was no clear heir apparent to rule the kingdom. The army upheld some of the functions of a popular assembly, a democratic institution that otherwise existed in only a handful of municipal governments within the Macedonian commonwealth: the Koinon of Macedonians. With their mining and tax revenues, the kings were responsible for funding the military, which included a navy that was established by Philip II and expanded during the Antigonid period.

== Sources and historiography ==
The earliest known government in ancient Macedonia was their monarchy, which lasted until 167 BC when it was abolished by the Romans. Written evidence about Macedonian governmental institutions made before Philip II of Macedon's reign (r. 359 – 336 BC) is both rare and non-Macedonian in origin. The main sources of early Macedonian historiography are the works of the 5th-century BC historians Herodotus and Thucydides, the 1st-century AD Diodorus Siculus, and the 2nd-century AD Justin. Contemporary accounts given by those such as Demosthenes were often hostile and unreliable; even Aristotle, who lived in Macedonia, provides us with terse accounts of its governing institutions. Polybius was a contemporary historian who wrote about Macedonia, while later historians include Livy, Quintus Curtius Rufus, Plutarch, and Arrian. The works of these historians affirm the hereditary monarchy of Macedonia and basic institutions, yet it remains unclear if there was an established constitution for Macedonian government. (Note: Contrary to Carol J. King, however, N. G. L. Hammond and F. W. Walbank write with apparent certainty and conviction when describing the Macedonian constitutional government restricting the king and involving a popular assembly of the army.) The main textual primary sources for the organization of Macedonia's military as it existed under Alexander the Great include Arrian, Quintus Curtius, Diodorus, and Plutarch, while modern historians rely mostly on Polybius and Livy for understanding detailed aspects of the Antigonid-period military. (Note: Sekunda 2010, pp. 446–447 writes the following: "... to this we can add the evidence provided by two magnificent archaeological monuments, the 'Alexander Sarcophagus' in particular and the 'Alexander Mosaic'... In the case of the Antigonid army ... valuable additional details are occasionally supplied by Diodorus and Plutarch, and by a series of inscriptions preserving sections of two sets of army regulations issued by Philip V.")

== Division of power ==
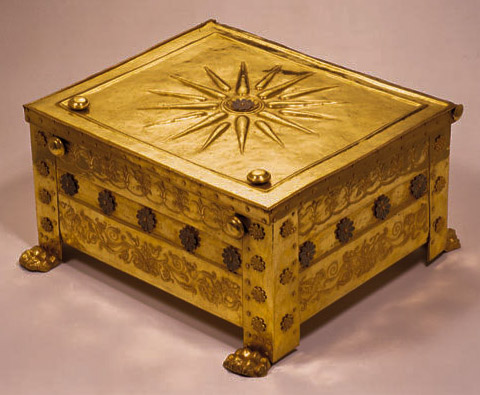
The Vergina Sun, the 16-ray star covering the royal burial larnax of Philip II of Macedon (r. 359 – 336 BC), discovered in the tomb of Vergina, formerly ancient Aigai

At the head of Macedonia's government was the king (basileus). From at least the reign of Philip II the king was assisted by the royal pages (basilikoi paides), bodyguards (somatophylakes), companions (hetairoi), friends (philoi), an assembly that included members of the military, and magistrates during the Hellenistic period. Evidence is lacking for the extent to which each of these groups shared authority with the king or if their existence had a basis in a formal constitutional framework. (Note: For an argument about the absolutism of the Macedonian monarchy, see Errington 1990, pp. 220–222.) Before the reign of Philip II, the only institution supported by textual evidence is the monarchy. In 1931, Friedrich Granier was the first to propose that by the time of Philip II's reign, Macedonia had a constitutional government with laws that delegated rights and customary privileges to certain groups, especially to its citizen soldiers, although the majority of evidence for the army's alleged right to appoint a new king and judge cases of treason stems from the reign of Alexander the Great (r. 336 – 323 BC). Pietro De Francisci refuted these ideas and advanced the theory that the Macedonian government was an autocracy ruled by the whim of the monarch, although this issue of kingship and governance is still unresolved in academia.

== Institutions ==
=== Kingship and the royal court ===
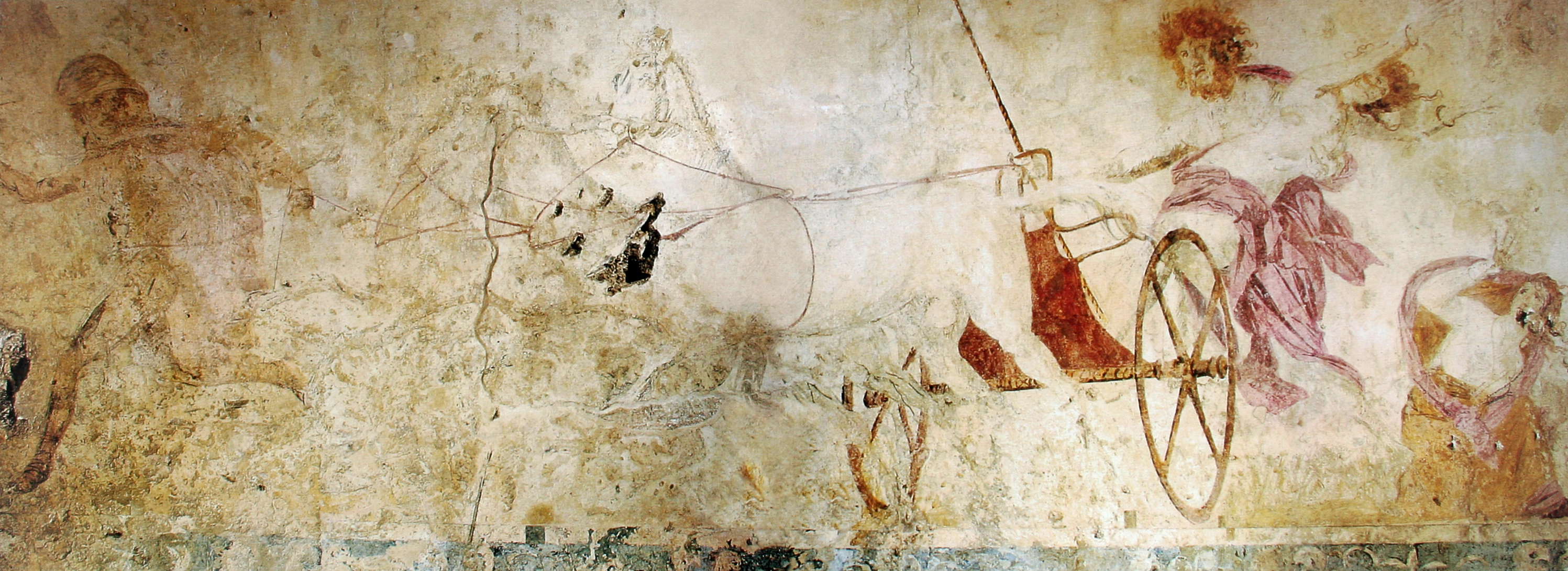
Hades abducting Persephone, fresco in the small Macedonian royal tomb at Vergina, Macedonia, Greece, c. 340 BC

The Macedonian hereditary monarchy existed since at least the time of Archaic Greece, perhaps evolving from a tribal system, and with roots in Mycenaean Greece in view of its seemingly Homeric aristocratic attributes. Thucydides wrote that in previous ages Macedonia was divided into small tribal regions, each with its own petty king. The tribes of Lower Macedonia eventually coalesced under one great king, who exercised power as an overlord over the lesser kings of Upper Macedonia. The Argead dynasty lasted from the reign of Perdiccas I of Macedon until that of Alexander IV of Macedon (r. 323 – 310 BC), supplanted by the Antigonid dynasty during the Hellenistic period. The direct line of father-to-son succession was broken after the assassination of Orestes of Macedon (r. 399 – 396 BC) in 396 BC, allegedly by his regent and successor Aeropus II of Macedon (r. 396 – c. 393 BC), clouding the issue of whether primogeniture was the established custom or if there was a constitutional right for an assembly of the army or of the people to choose another king. It is also unclear whether certain male offspring were considered more legitimate than others, since Archelaus I of Macedon (r. 413 – 399 BC) was the son of Perdiccas II of Macedon (r. c. 454 – 413 BC) and a slave woman, although Archelaus succeeded the throne after murdering his father's designated heir apparent and son from another mother.

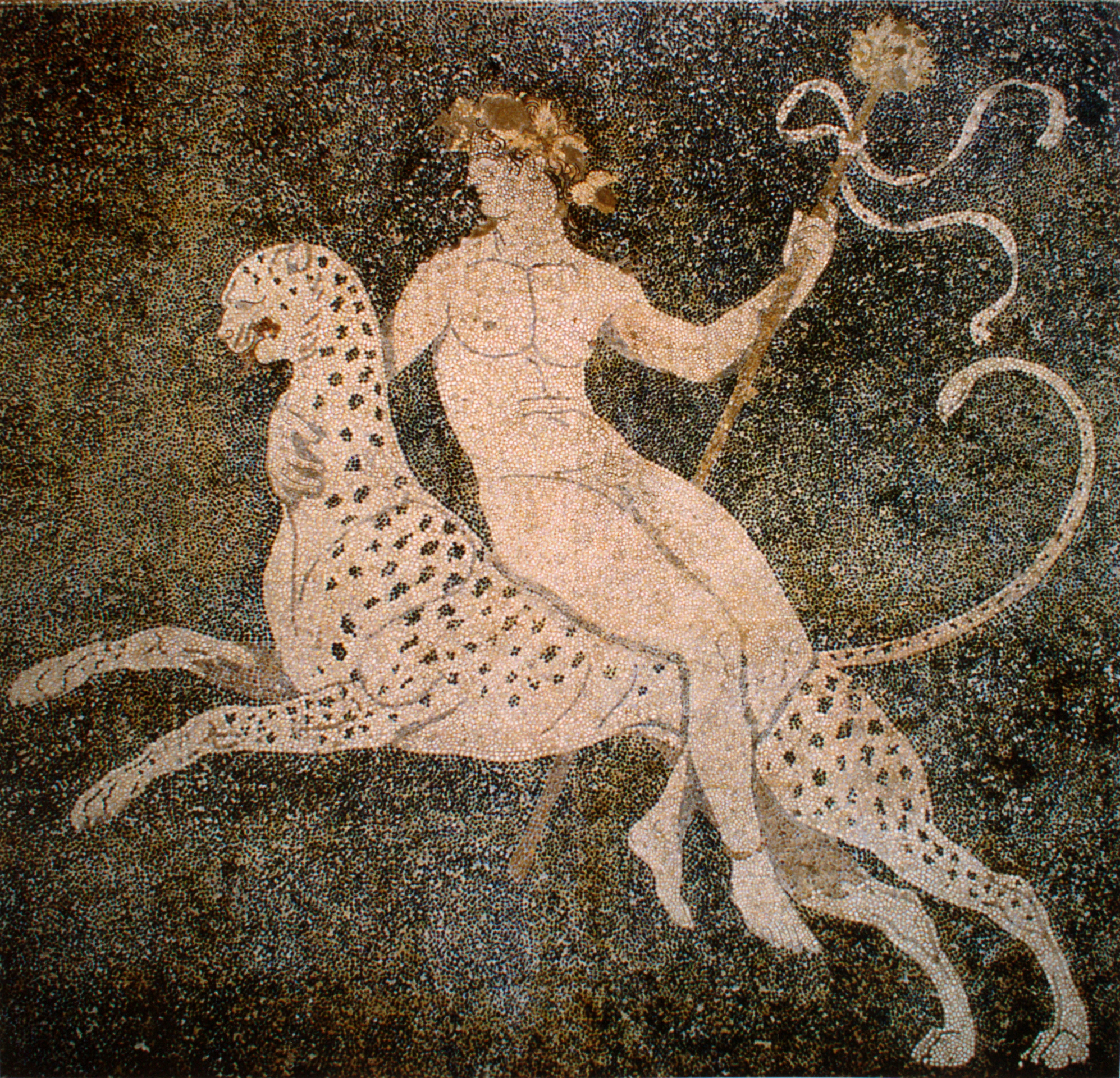
The god Dionysos riding a cheetah, mosaic floor in the "House of Dionysos" at Pella, Greece, c. 330–300 BC

Historical sources confirm that the Macedonian kings before Philip II at least upheld the privileges and responsibilities of hosting foreign diplomats, initiating the kingdom's foreign policies, and negotiating deals such as alliances with foreign powers. After the Greek victory at the Battle of Salamis in 480 BC, the Persian commander Mardonius had Alexander I of Macedon (r. c. 497 – c. 454 BC) sent to Athens as a chief envoy to orchestrate an alliance between the Achaemenid Empire and Athens. The decision to send Alexander was based on his marriage alliance with a noble Persian house and his previous formal relationship with the city-state of Athens. With their ownership of natural resources including gold, silver, timber, and royal land, the early Macedonian kings were also capable of bribing foreign and domestic parties with impressive gifts.

Little is known about the judicial system of ancient Macedonia except that the king acted as the chief judge of the kingdom. The Macedonian kings were also supreme commanders of the military, with early evidence including not only Alexander I's role in the Greco-Persian Wars but also with the city-state of Potidaea accepting Perdiccas II of Macedon as their commander during their rebellion against the Delian League of Athens in 432 BC. In addition to the esteem won by serving as Macedonia's supreme commander, Philip II was also highly regarded for his acts of piety in serving as the high priest of the nation. He performed daily ritual sacrifices and led religious festivals. Alexander imitated various aspects of his father's reign, such as granting land and gifts to loyal aristocratic followers. However, he lost some core support among them for adopting some of the trappings of a Persian monarch, a "lord and master" as Carol J. King suggests, instead of a "comrade-in-arms" as was the traditional relationship of Macedonian kings with their companions. His father Philip II had already shown signs of being influenced by the Persian Empire when he adopted similar institutions, such as having a Royal Secretary, royal archive, royal pages, and a throne, although there is some scholarly debate as to the level of Persian influence in Philip's court.

=== Royal pages ===
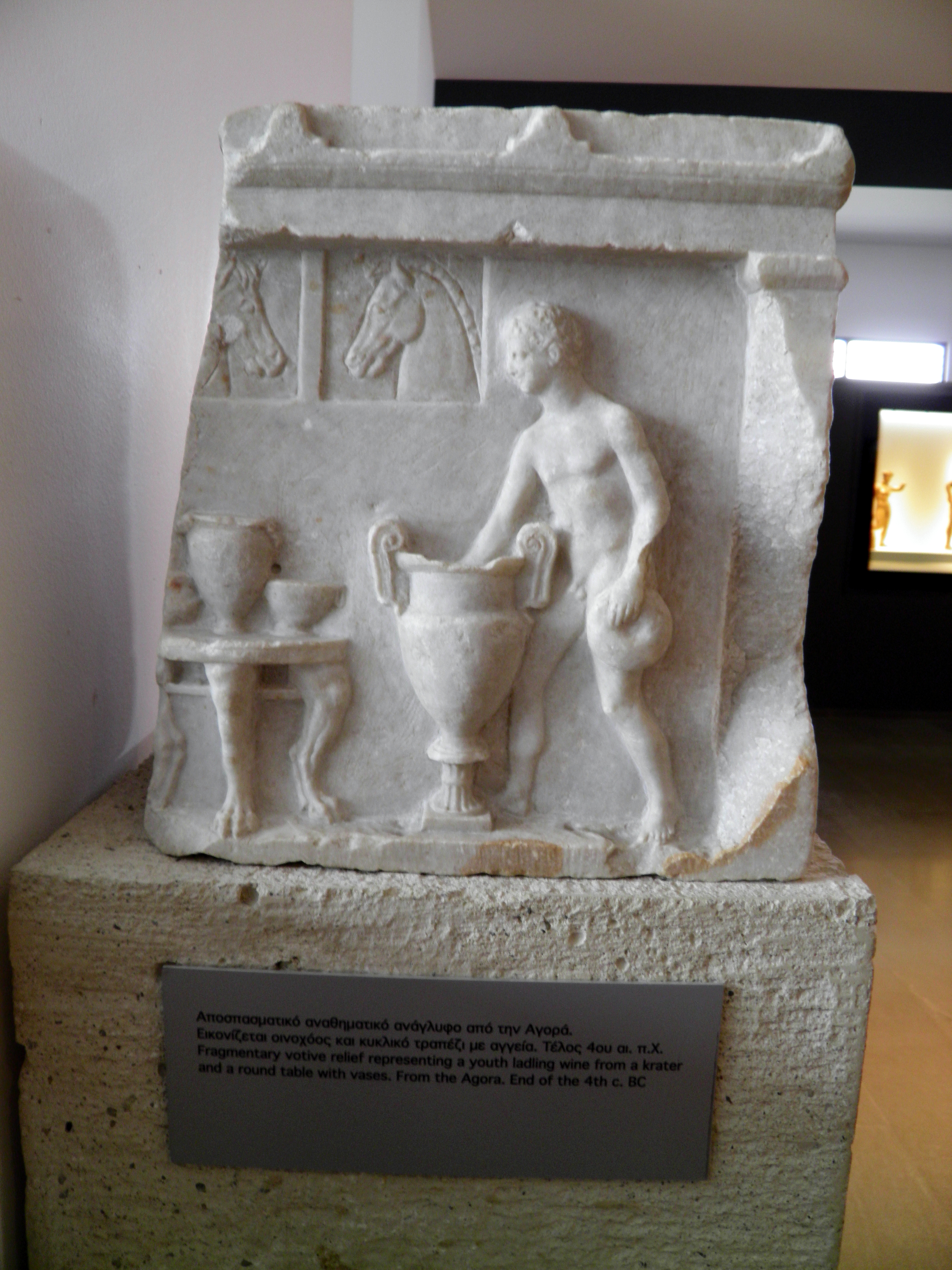
Fragmentary votive relief depicting a youth ladling wine from a krater next to a round table with vases, from the agora of Pella, end of 4th century BC, Archaeological Museum of Pella

The royal pages were adolescent boys and young men conscripted from aristocratic households and serving the kings of Macedonia perhaps from the reign of Philip II onward, although more solid evidence for their presence in the royal court dates to the reign of Alexander the Great. (Note: According to Carol J. King, there was no "certain reference" to this institutional group until the military campaigns of Alexander the Great in Asia. However, N.G.L. Hammond and F.W. Walbank state that the royal pages are attested to as far back as the reign of Archelaus I of Macedon.) Royal pages played no direct role in high politics and were conscripted as a means to introduce them to political life. After a period of training and service, pages were expected to become members of the king's companions and personal retinue. During their training, pages were expected to guard the king as he slept, supply him with horses, aid him in mounting his horse, accompany him on royal hunts, and serve him during symposia (i.e. formal drinking parties). While conscripted pages would have looked forward to a lifelong career at court or even a prestigious post as a governor, they can also be regarded as hostages held by the royal court in order to ensure the loyalty and obedience of their aristocratic fathers. The abusive punishment of pages, such as flogging, carried out by the king at times, led to intrigue and conspiracy against the Crown, as did the frequent homosexual relations between the pages and the elite, sometimes with the king. Although there is little evidence for royal pages throughout the Antigonid period, it is known that a group of them fled with Perseus of Macedon (r. 179 – 168 BC) to Samothrace following his defeat by the Romans in 168 BC.

=== Bodyguards ===
Royal bodyguards served as the closest members to the king at court and on the battlefield. They were split into two categories: the agema or the hypaspistai, a type of ancient special forces usually numbering in the hundreds, and a smaller group of men handpicked by the king either for their individual merits or to honor the noble families to which they belonged, respectively. Therefore, the bodyguards, limited in number and forming the king's inner circle, were not always responsible for protecting the king's life on and off the battlefield; their title and office was more a mark of distinction, perhaps used to quell rivalries between aristocratic houses.

=== Companions, friends, councils, and assemblies ===
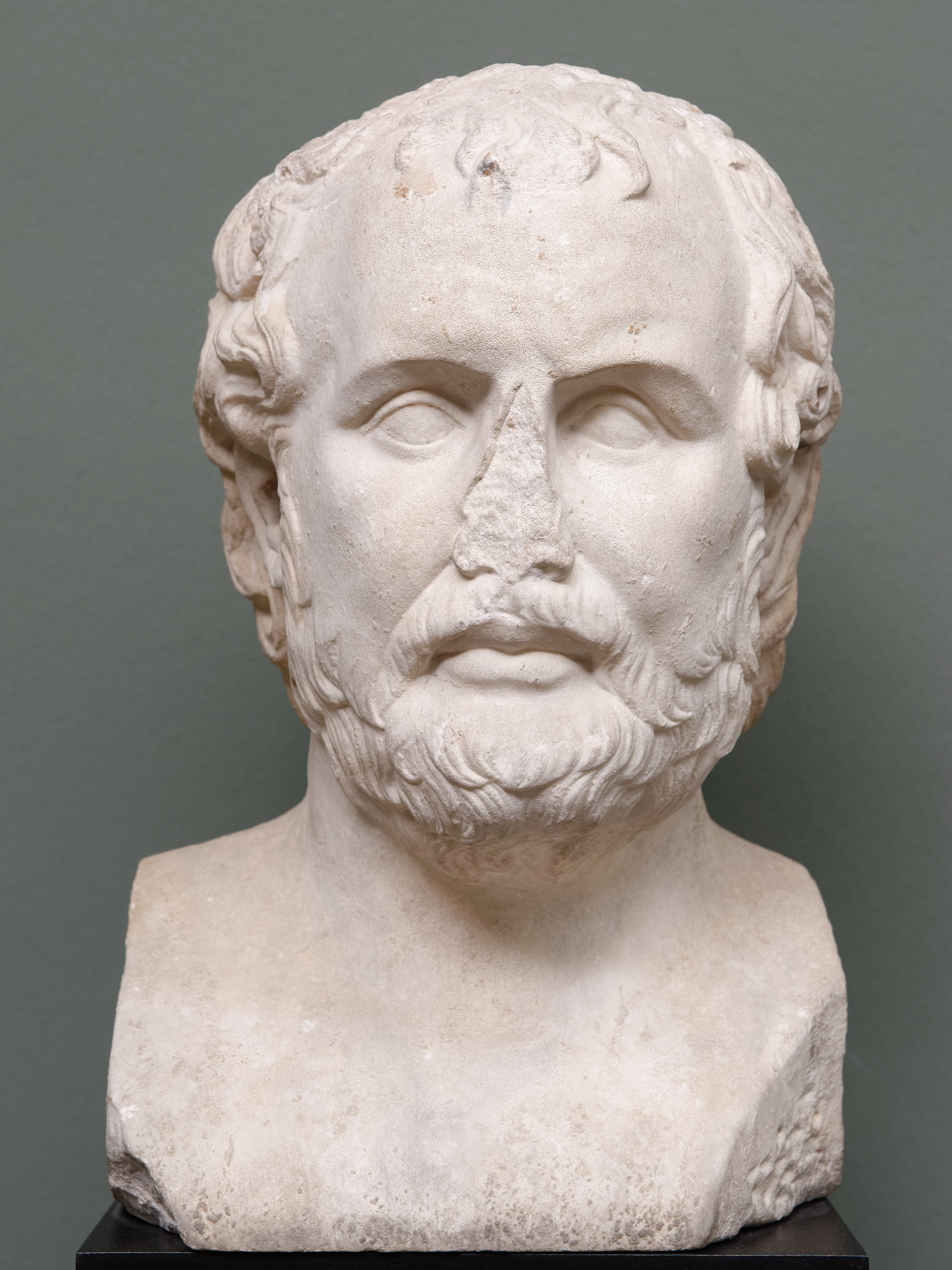
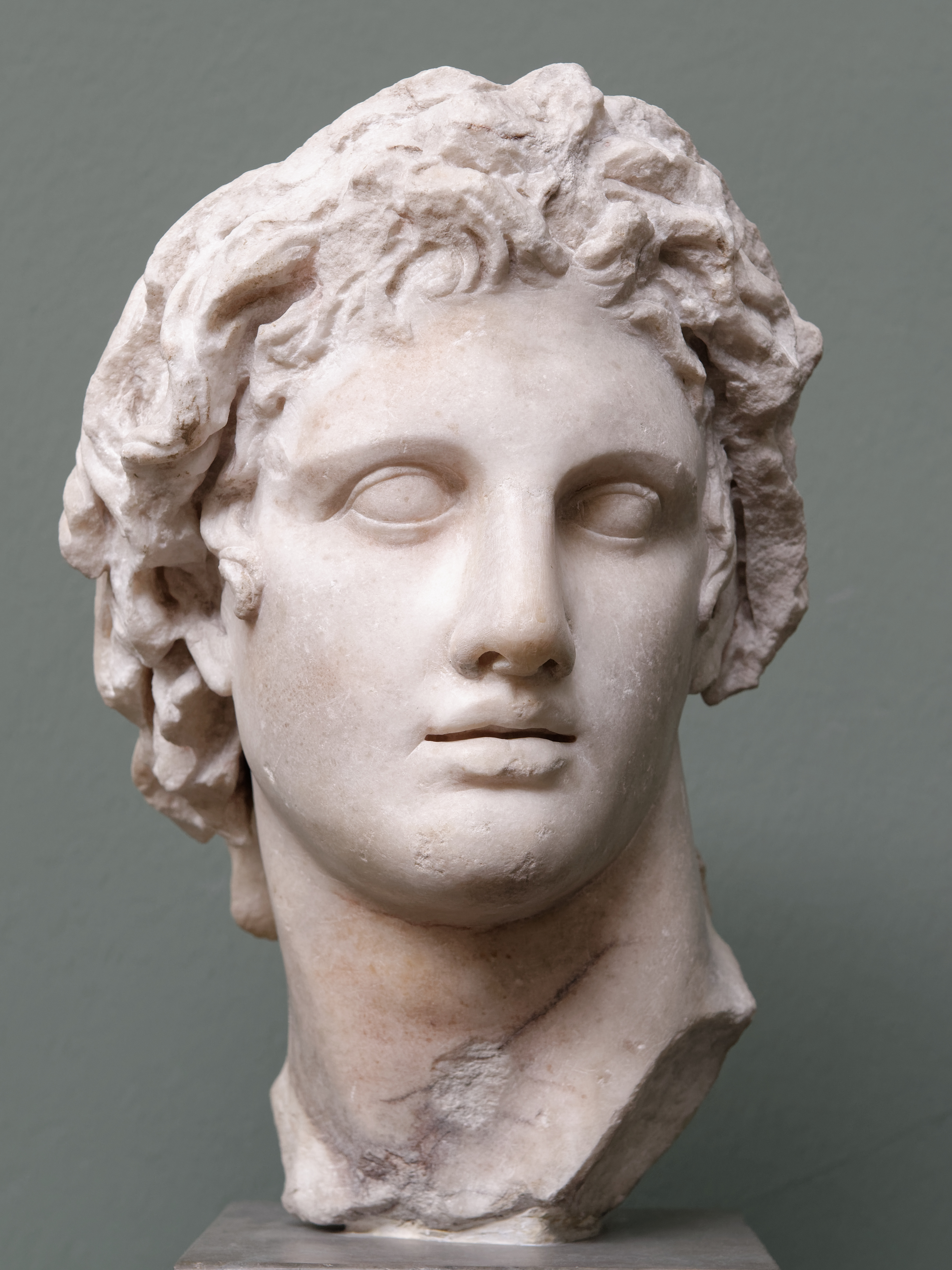
Left: Roman copy of an original Greek bust of Philip II, dating from the 4th-century BC, now at the Ny Carlsberg Glyptotek
Right: Hellenistic bust depicting a young Alexander the Great, dating to the 3rd-century BC, from Ptolemaic Egypt, now at the Ny Carlsberg Glyptotek

The companions, including the elite companion cavalry and pezhetairoi infantry, represented a substantially larger group than the king's bodyguards. The ranks of the companions were greatly increased during the reign of Philip II when he expanded this institution to include Upper Macedonian aristocrats as well as Greeks. The most trusted or highest ranking companions formed a council that served as an advisory body to the king, called the synedrion. A small amount of evidence also suggests that an assembly of the army during times of war and a people's assembly during times of peace existed in ancient Macedonia. The first recorded instance dates to 359 BC, when Philip II called together a number of assemblies to address them with speech and raise their morale following the death of Perdiccas III of Macedon (r. c. 365 – 359 BC) in battle against the Illyrians.

Members of the council had the right to speak their minds freely, and although there is no evidence that they voted on affairs of state or that the king was even obligated to implement their ideas, it is clear that he was at least occasionally pressured to do so. The assembly was apparently given the right to judge cases of high treason and assign punishments for them, such as when Alexander III acted as prosecutor in the trial and ultimate conviction of three alleged conspirators in the plot to assassinate Philip II (while many others were acquitted). However, there is perhaps insufficient evidence to allow a conclusion that councils and assemblies were regularly upheld, constitutionally grounded, or that their decisions were always heeded by the king. At the death of Alexander the Great, the companions immediately formed a council to assume control of his empire; however, it was soon destabilized by open rivalry and conflict between its members. The army also used mutiny as a tool to achieve political ends. For instance, when Perdiccas had Philip II's daughter Cynane murdered to prevent her own daughter Eurydice II of Macedon from marrying Philip III of Macedon (r. 323 – 317 BC), the army revolted and ensured that the marriage took place.

=== Magistrates, the commonwealth, local government, and allied states ===
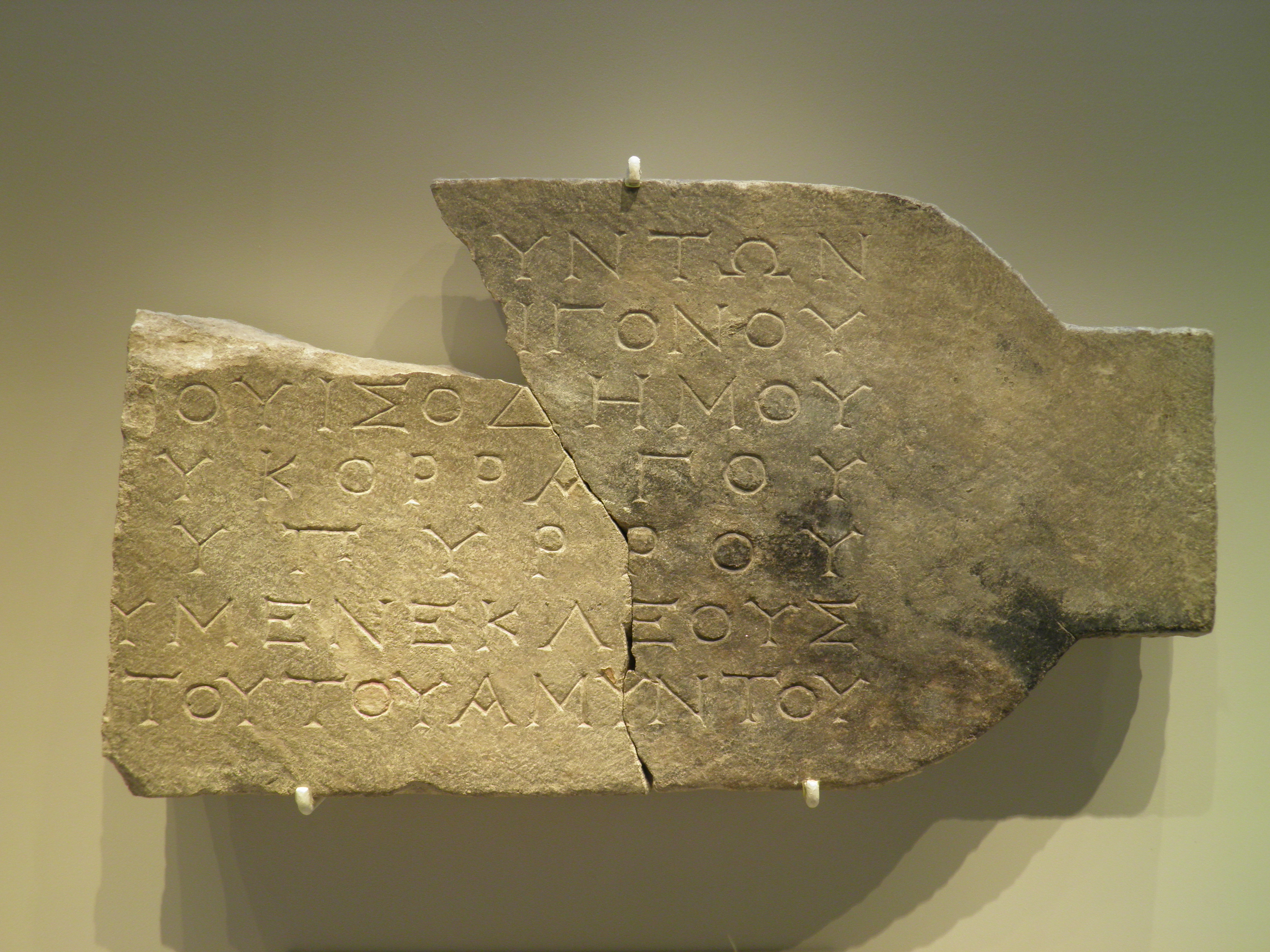
A fragmentary inscription bearing the names of six city archons (politarchs), 2nd century BC, Archaeological Museum of Pella

There is epigraphic evidence from the Hellenistic period and Antigonid dynasty that the Macedonian kingdom relied on various regional officials to conduct affairs of state. This included a number of high-ranking municipal officials, including the military-rooted strategos and politarch, i.e. the elected governor (archon) of a large city (polis), but also the politico-religious office of the epistates. Although these were highly influential members of local and regional government, Carol J. King asserts that they were not collectively powerful enough to formally challenge the authority of the Macedonian king or his right to rule. Robert Malcolm Errington affirms that no evidence exists about the personal backgrounds of these officials, although they may have been picked from the available aristocratic pools of philoi and hetairoi that were used to fill vacancies of officers in the army.

In ancient Athens, the Athenian democracy was restored on three separate occasions following the initial conquest of the city by Antipater in 322 BC. However, when it fell repeatedly under Macedonian rule it was governed by a Macedonian-imposed oligarchy composed of the wealthiest members of the city-state, their membership determined by the value of their property. (Note: Amemiya 2007, pp. 11–12: under Antipater's oligarchy, the lower value in terms of property for acceptable members of the oligarchy was 2,000 drachma. Athenian democracy was restored briefly after Antipater's death in 319 BC, yet his son Cassander reconquered the city, which came under the regency of Demetrius of Phalerum. Demetrius lowered the property limit for oligarchic members to 1,000 drachma, yet by 307 BC he was exiled from the city and direct democracy was restored. Demetrius I of Macedon reconquered Athens in 295 BC, yet democracy was once again restored in 287 BC with the aid of Ptolemy I of Egypt. Antigonus II Gonatas, son of Demetrius I, reconquered Athens in 260 BC, followed by a succession of Macedonian kings ruling over Athens until the Roman Republic conquered both Macedonia and then mainland Greece by 146 BC.) Yet other city-states were handled quite differently and were allowed a greater degree of autonomy. After Philip II conquered Amphipolis in 357 BC, the city was allowed to retain its democracy, including its constitution, popular assembly, city council (boule), and yearly elections for new officials, but a Macedonian garrison was housed within the city walls along with a Macedonian royal commissioner (epistates) to monitor the city's political affairs. The city of Philippi, founded by Philip II, was the only other city in the Macedonian commonwealth that had a democratic government with popular assemblies, since the assembly (ecclesia) of Thessaloniki seems to have had only a passive function in practice. Some cities also maintained their own municipal revenues, although evidence is lacking as to whether this was derived from local taxation or grants from the royal court. The Macedonian king and central government otherwise sustained strict control over the finances administered by other cities, especially in regards to the revenues generated by temples and cultic priesthoods.

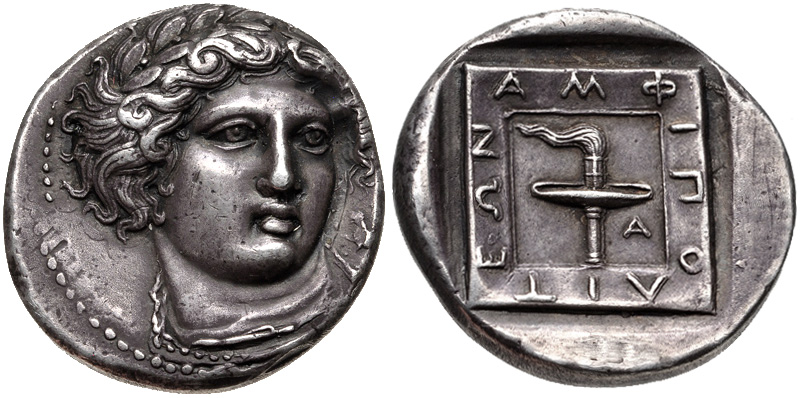
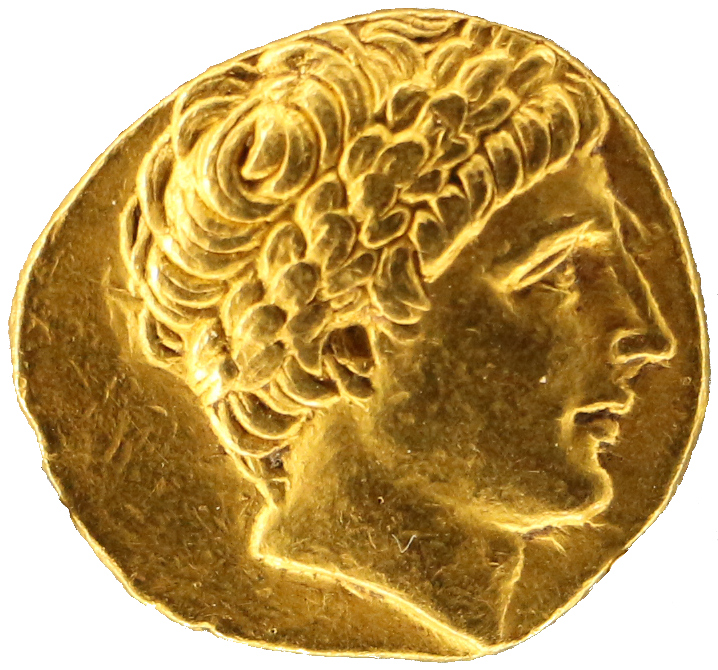
Left: a silver tetradrachm issued by the city of Amphipolis in 364–363 BC (before its conquest by Philip II of Macedon in 357 BC), showing the head of Apollo on the obverse and racing torch on the reverse
Right: a golden stater depicting Philip II, minted at Amphipolis in 340 BC (or later during Alexander's reign), shortly after its conquest by Philip II and incorporation into the Macedonian commonwealth

Within the Macedonian commonwealth, or the Koinon of Macedonians, there is some epigraphic evidence from the 3rd century BC that foreign relations were handled by the central government. Although Macedonian cities nominally participated in panhellenic events on their own accord, in reality the granting of asylia (inviolability, diplomatic immunity, and the right of asylum at sanctuaries) to certain cities (e.g. Kyzikos in Anatolia) was handled directly by the king or a preexisting regulation. Likewise, the city-states within contemporary Greek koina (i.e., federations of city-states, the sympoliteia) obeyed the federal decrees voted on collectively by the members of their league. (Note: Unlike the sparse Macedonian examples, ample textual evidence of this exists for the Achaean League, Acarnanian League, and Achaean League; see Hatzopoulos 1996, pp. 366–367.) In city-states belonging to a league or commonwealth, the granting of proxenia (i.e. the hosting of foreign ambassadors) was usually a right shared by local and central authorities. While there is plenty of surviving evidence that the granting of proxenia was the sole prerogative of central authorities in the neighboring Epirote League, a small amount of evidence suggests the same arrangement in the Macedonian commonwealth. However, city-states that were allied with the Kingdom of Macedonia and existed outside of Macedonia proper issued their own decrees regarding proxenia. Foreign leagues also formed alliances with the Macedonian kings, such as when the Cretan League signed treaties with Demetrius II Aetolicus and Antigonus III Doson ensuring enlistment of Cretan mercenaries into the Macedonian army, and elected Philip V of Macedon (r. 222 – 179 BC) as honorary protector (prostates) of the league.

=== Military ===
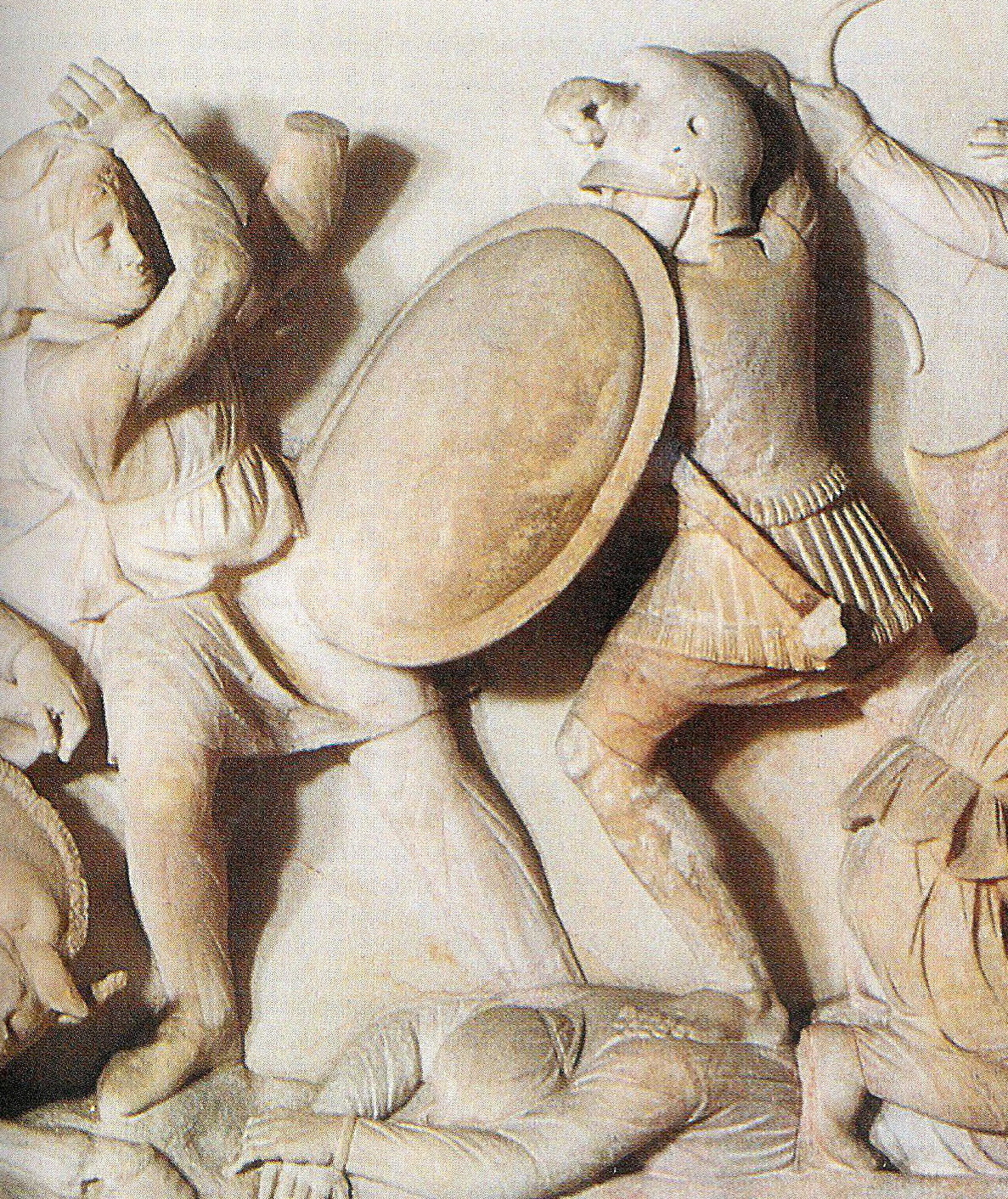
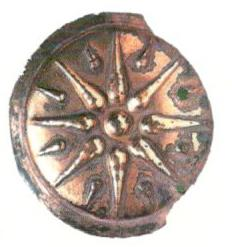
Left image: a Macedonian infantryman, possibly a hypaspist, equipped with an aspis shield and wearing a linothorax cuirass and Thracian helmet; bas relief from the Alexander Sarcophagus, 4th century BC
Right image: an ancient Macedonian bronze shield excavated from the archaeological site at Bonče in the Republic of North Macedonia, dated 4th century BC

==== Early Macedonian army ====
The basic structure of the army was the division of the companion cavalry (hetairoi) with the foot companions (pezhetairoi), augmented by various allied troops, foreign levied soldiers, and mercenaries. The foot companions existed perhaps since the reign of Alexander I of Macedon, while Macedonian troops are accounted for in the history of Herodotus as subjects of the Persian Empire fighting the Greeks at the Battle of Plataea in 479 BC. Macedonian cavalry, wearing muscled cuirasses, became renowned in Greece during and after their involvement in the Peloponnesian War (431–404 BC), at times siding with either Athens or Sparta and supplemented by local Greek infantry instead of relying on Macedonian infantry. Macedonian infantry in this period consisted of poorly trained shepherds and farmers, while the cavalry was composed of noblemen eager to win glory. An early 4th-century BC stone-carved relief from Pella shows a Macedonian infantryman wearing a pilos helmet and wielding a short sword showing a pronounced Spartan influence on the Macedonian army before Philip II. Nicholas Victor Sekunda writes that at the beginning of Philip II's reign in 359 BC, the Macedonian army consisted of 10,000 infantry and 600 cavalry, the latter figure similar to that recorded for the 5th century BC. However, Malcolm Errington cautions that any figures for Macedonian troop sizes provided by ancient authors should be treated with a degree of skepticism, since there are very few means by which modern historians are capable of confirming their veracity, and the true number could have been possibly lower or even higher than the amount stated.

==== Philip II and Alexander the Great ====
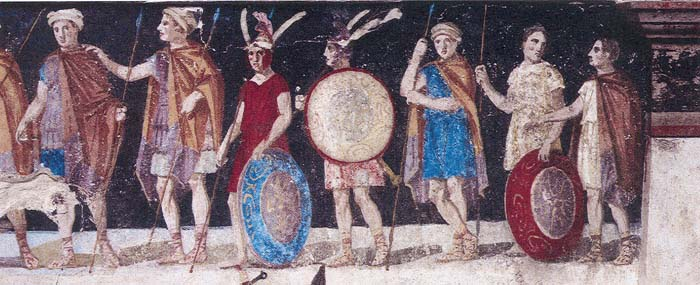
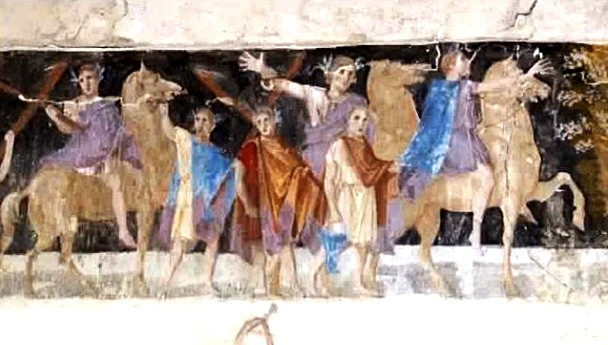
An ancient fresco of Macedonian soldiers from the tomb of Agios Athanasios, Thessaloniki, Greece, 4th century BC

Imitating the Greek example of martial exercises and issuance of standard equipment for citizen soldiery, Philip II transformed the Macedonian army from a levied force of unprofessional farmers into a well-trained fighting force. (Note: Errington 1990, p. 238; 247 writes the following: "the crucial necessity of drilling troops must have become clear to Philip at the latest during his time as a hostage in Thebes.") Philip II's infantry wielded peltai shields that already diverged from the aspis style shield featured in sculpted artwork of a Katerini tomb dated perhaps to the reign of Amyntas III of Macedon. His early infantry were also equipped with protective helmets and greaves, as well as sarissa pikes, yet according to Sekunda they were eventually equipped with heavier armor such as cuirasses, since the Third Philippic of Demosthenes in 341 BC described them as hoplites instead of lighter peltasts. As evidenced by the Alexander Sarcophagus, troops serving Alexander the Great were also armored in the hoplite fashion. However, Errington argues that breastplates were not worn by the phalanx pikemen of either Philip II or Philip V's reign periods (during which sufficient evidence exists). Instead, he claims that breastplates were only worn by military officers, while pikemen wore the kotthybos stomach bands along with their helmets and greaves, wielding a dagger as a secondary weapon along with their shields.

The elite hypaspistai infantry, composed of handpicked men from the ranks of the pezhetairoi and perhaps synonymous with earlier doryphoroi, were formed during the reign of Philip II and saw continued use during the reign of Alexander the Great. Philip II was also responsible for the establishment of the royal bodyguards (somatophylakes) and royal pages (basilikoi paides). Philip II was also able to field archers, including mercenary Cretan archers and perhaps some native Macedonians. It is unclear if the Thracians, Paionians, and Illyrians fighting as javelin throwers, slingers, and archers serving in Macedonian armies from the reign of Philip II onward were conscripted as allies via a treaty or were simply hired mercenaries. Philip II hired engineers such as Polyidus of Thessaly and Diades of Pella, who were capable of building state of the art siege engines and artillery firing large bolts. Following the acquisition of the lucrative mines at Krinides (renamed Philippi), the royal treasury could afford to field a permanent, professional standing army. The increase in state revenues allowed the Macedonians to build a small navy for the first time, which included triremes. Although it did not succeed in every battle, the army of Philip II was able to successfully adopt the military tactics of its enemies, such as the embolon (i.e. 'flying wedge') formation of the Scythians. This offered cavalry far greater maneuverability and an edge in battle that previously did not exist in the Classical Greek world.

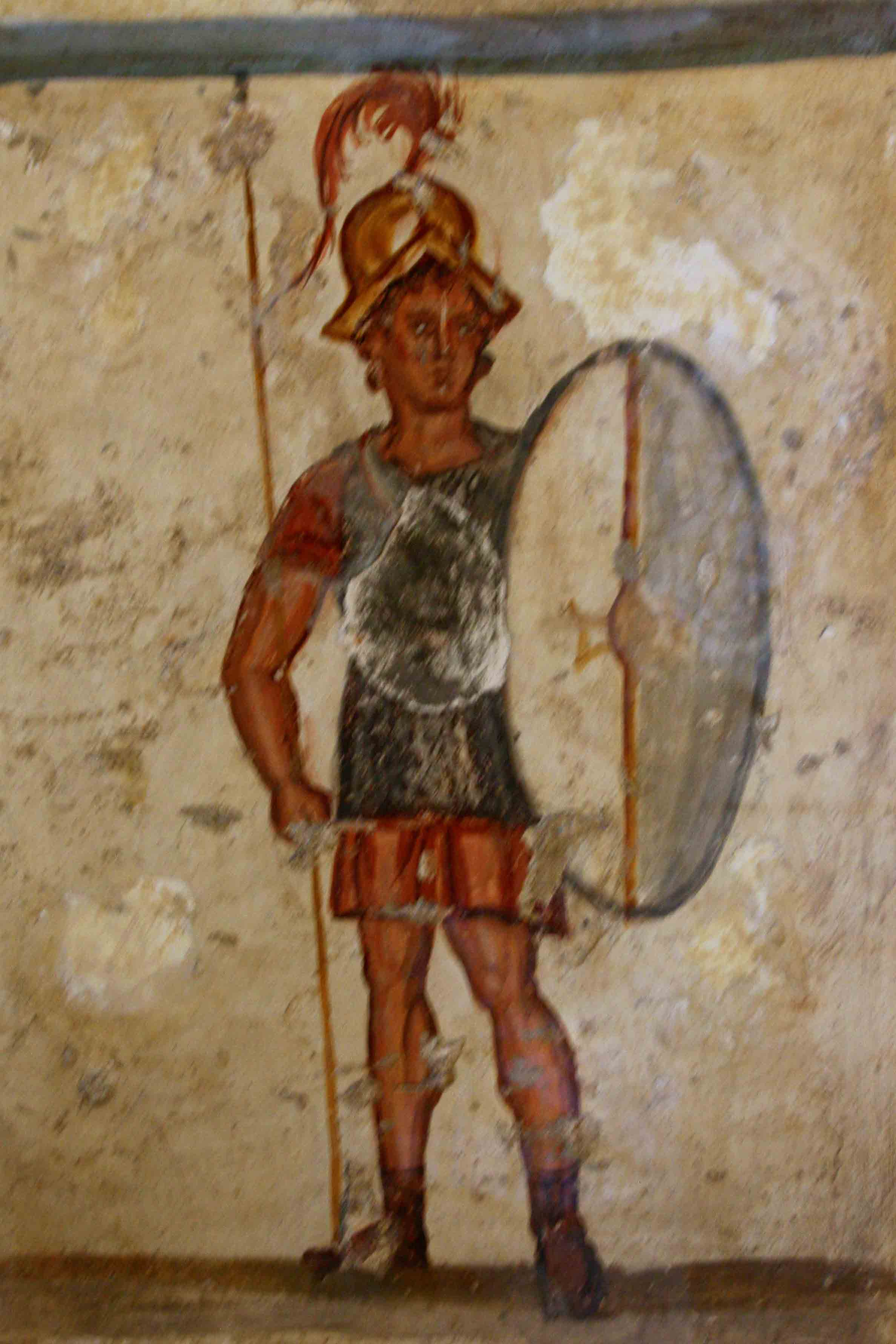
Fresco of an ancient Macedonian soldier (thorakites) wearing chainmail armor and bearing a thureos shield, 3rd century BC, İstanbul Archaeology Museums

During the reign of Alexander the Great, the only Macedonian cavalry units attested in battle were the companion cavalry. However, during his campaign in Asia against the Persian Empire he formed a hipparchia (i.e. unit of a few hundred horsemen) of companion cavalry composed entirely of ethnic Persians. When marching his forces into Asia, Alexander brought 1,800 cavalrymen from Macedonia, 1,800 cavalrymen from Thessaly, 600 cavalrymen from the rest of Greece, and 900 prodromoi cavalry from Thrace. Antipater was able to quickly levy 600 native Macedonian cavalry to fight in the Lamian War when it began in 323 BC. For his infantry, the most elite members of his hypaspistai were designated as the agema, yet a new term for hypaspistai emerged after the Battle of Gaugamela in 331 BC: the argyraspides ('silver shields'). The latter continued to serve after the reign of Alexander the Great and may have been of Asian origin. (Note: Sekunda 2010, pp. 455–456; see also Errington 1990, p. 245: in regards to both the argyraspides and chalkaspides, "these titles were probably not functional, perhaps not even official.") Overall, his pike-wielding infantry numbered some 12,000 men, 3,000 of which were elite hypaspista and 9,000 of which were pezhetairoi. (Note: In contrast to Nicholas V. Sekunda and in discussing the discrepancies among ancient historians about the size of Alexander the Great's army, N.G.L. Hammond and F.W. Walbank choose Diodorus Siculus' figure of 32,000 infantry as the most reliable, while disagreeing with his figure for cavalry at 4,500, asserting it was closer to 5,100 horsemen.) Alexander continued the use of Cretan archers, yet around this time a clear reference to the use of native Macedonian archers was made. After the Battle of Gaugamela, archers of West Asian backgrounds became commonplace and were organized into chiliarchs (units comprising around a thousand men each).

==== Antigonid period military ====
The Macedonian army continued to evolve under the Antigonid dynasty. It is uncertain how many men were appointed as somatophylakes, which numbered eight men at the end of Alexander the Great's reign, while the hypaspistai seem to have morphed into assistants of the somatophylakes rather than a separate unit in their own right. (Note: Sekunda 2010, p. 459; Errington 1990, p. 245: "Other developments in Macedonian army organization are evident after Alexander. One is the evolution of the hypaspistai from an elite unit to a form of military police or bodyguard under Philip V; the only thing the two functions had in common was the particular closeness to the king.") At the Battle of Cynoscephalae in 197 BC, the Macedonians commanded some 16,000 phalanx pikemen. Alexander the Great's 'royal squadron' of companion cavalry were similarly numbered to the 800 cavalrymen of the 'sacred squadron' (Latin: sacra ala; Greek: hiera ile) commanded by Philip V of Macedon during the Social War of 219 BC. Due to the Roman historian Livy's accounts of the battles of Callinicus in 171 BC and Pydna in 168 BC, it is known that the Macedonian cavalry were also divided into groups with similarly named officers as had existed in Alexander's day. The regular Macedonian cavalry numbered 3,000 at Callinicus, which was separate from the 'sacred squadron' and 'royal cavalry'. While Macedonian cavalry of the 4th century BC had fought without shields, the use of shields by cavalry was adopted from the Celtic invaders of the 270s BC who settled in Galatia, central Anatolia.

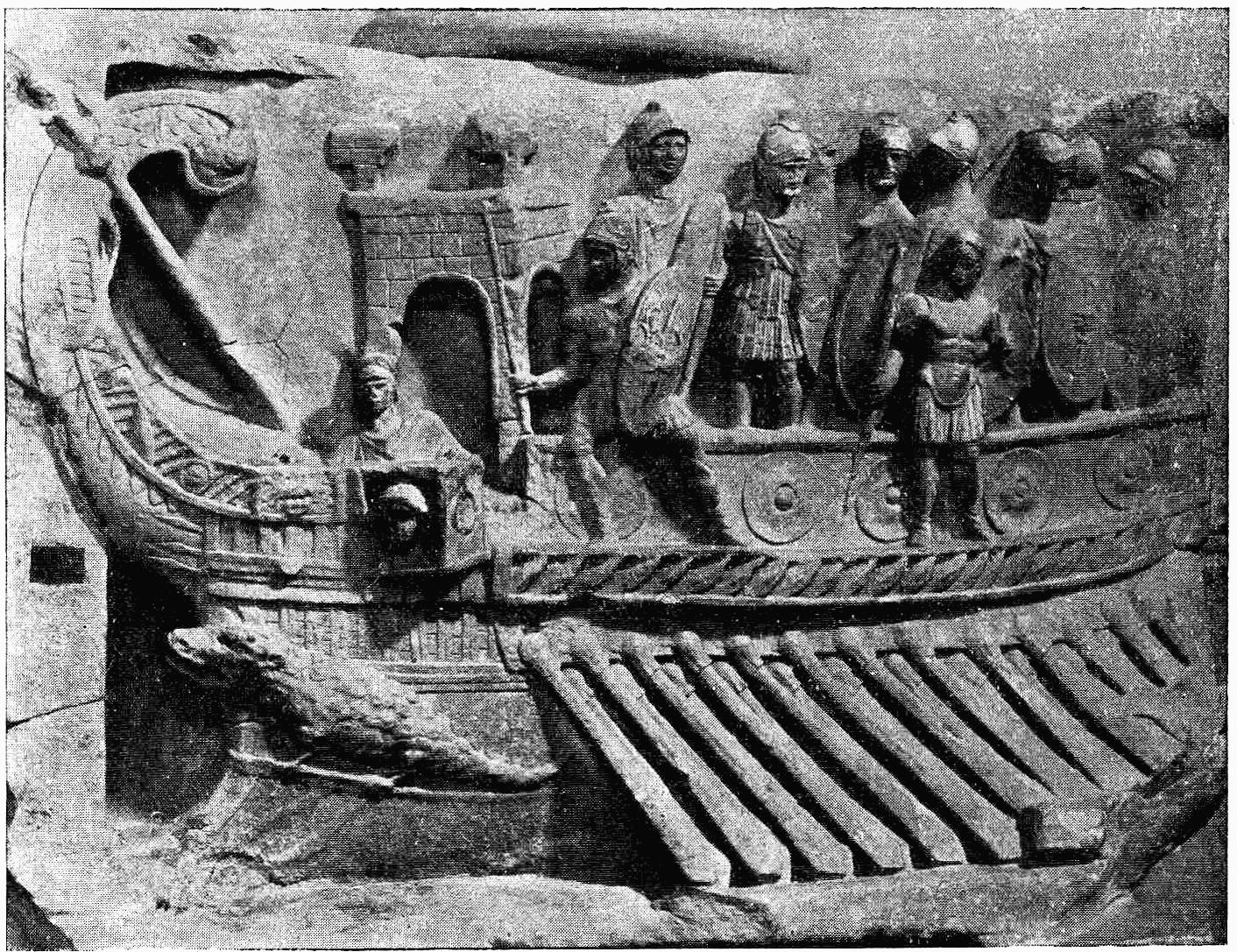
A Roman naval bireme depicted in a relief from the Temple of Fortuna Primigenia in Praeneste (Palastrina), which was built c. 120 BC; Museo Pio-Clementino, Vatican Museums

Thanks to contemporary inscriptions from Amphipolis and Greia dated 218 and 181 respectively, historians have been able to partially piece together the organization of the Antigonid army under Philip V, such as its command by tetrarchai officers assisted by grammateis (i.e. secretaries or clerks). (Note: Sekunda 2010, pp. 460–461; for the evolution of Macedonian military titles, see also Errington 1990, pp. 242–243 for further details.) The most elite, veteran Antigonid-period Macedonian infantry from at least the time of Antigonus III Doson were the peltasts, lighter and more maneuverable soldiers wielding peltai javelins, swords, and a smaller bronze shield than Macedonian phalanx pikemen, although they sometimes served in that capacity. (Note: Sekunda 2010, pp. 461–462; Errington 1990, p. 245 writes the following: "The other development, which happened at the latest under Doson, was the formation and training of a special unit of peltastai separate from the phalanx. This unit operated as a form of royal guard similar in function to the earlier hypaspistai.") Among the peltasts, roughly 2,000 men were selected to serve in the elite agema vanguard, with other peltasts numbering roughly 3,000. The amount of peltasts varied over time, perhaps never more than 5,000 men (the largest figure mentioned by ancient historians, an amount that existed in the Social War of 219 BC). The peltasts fought alongside the phalanx pikemen, divided now into 'bronze shield' (chalkaspides) and 'white shield' (leukaspides) regiments, up until the very end of the kingdom in 168 BC.

Following the initiative of Philip II, Macedonian kings continued to expand and equip the navy. Cassander maintained a small fleet at Pydna, Demetrius I of Macedon (r. 294 – 288 BC) had one at Pella, and Antigonus II Gonatas (r. c. 229 – 222 BC), while serving as a general for Demetrius in Greece, used the navy to secure the Macedonian holdings in Demetrias, Chalkis, Piraeus, and Corinth. The navy was considerably expanded during the Chremonidean War (267–261 BC), allowing the Macedonian navy to defeat the Ptolemaic Egyptian navy in the 255 BC Battle of Cos and 245 BC Battle of Andros, and enabling Macedonian influence to spread over the Cyclades. Antigonus III Doson used the Macedonian navy to invade Caria, while Philip V allegedly sent two-hundred ships, some of them captured from the Ptolemies, to fight in the (unsuccessful) Battle of Chios in 201 BC. The Macedonian navy was reduced to a mere six vessels as agreed in the 197 BC peace treaty that concluded the Second Macedonian War with the Roman Republic, although Perseus of Macedon quickly assembled some lemboi at the outbreak of the Third Macedonian War in 171 BC.

== Currency, finances, and resources ==
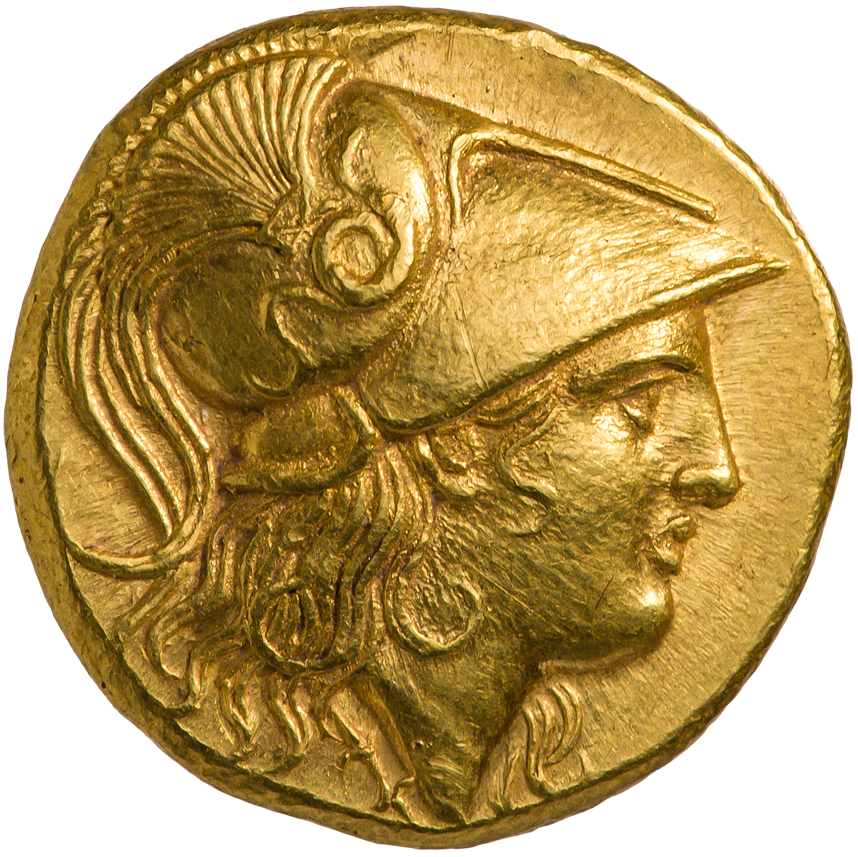
Coin of Alexander the Great minted at Miletus, depicting his profile in armor

The minting of silver coinage began during the reign of Alexander I as a means to pay for royal expenditures. Archelaus I increased the silver content of his coins in addition to minting copper coins in order to promote foreign and domestic commerce. Macedonians were the first who issued different coins for internal and external circulation, a sophisticated approach which shows an elaborate monetary system at an early date. In order to properly pay the soldiers of the Macedonian army with something other than general spoils of war, the minting of coinage significantly increased during the reigns of Philip II and Alexander the Great, especially after the increase in state revenues following the seizure of the Pangaion Hills. During the Hellenistic period the royal houses of Macedonia, Ptolemaic Egypt, and the Kingdom of Pergamon exercised full monopolistic control over mining activities, largely to ensure the funding of their armies. By the end of the conquests of Alexander the Great, nearly thirty mints stretching from Macedonia to Babylon were producing nearly identical standard coins. Yet the right to mint coins was shared by the central and some local governments, i.e. the autonomous municipal governments of Thessaloniki, Pella, and Amphipolis within the Macedonian commonwealth.

In addition to mining, the crown and central authorities also raised revenues by collecting produce from arable lands, timber from forests, and taxes on imports and exports at harbors. The king was capable of exploiting the mines, groves, agricultural lands, and forests belonging to the Macedonian state, although these were often leased as assets or given as grants to members of the nobility such as the hetairoi and philoi. Tariffs exacted on goods flowing in and out of Macedonian seaports began since at least the reign of Amyntas III, while the Oikonomika by Pseudo-Aristotle explains how Callistratus of Aphidnae (died c. 350 BC) aided Perdiccas III in doubling the kingdom's annual profits on customs duties from 20 to 40 talents.

After the defeat of Perseus of Macedon at the Battle of Pydna in 168 BC, the Roman Senate allowed the reopening of iron and copper mines, but forbade the mining of gold and silver by the four newly established autonomous client states which replaced the Macedonian monarchy. However, the monarchy was briefly revived by the pretender to the throne Andriscus in 150–148 BC, followed by the Roman victory in the Fourth Macedonian War and establishment of the Roman province of Macedonia. The Roman-era historians Livy and Diodorus Siculus asserted that the law was originally conceived by the Senate due to the fear that material wealth gained from gold and silver mining operations would allow the Macedonians to fund an armed rebellion. It is also possible that the Romans were concerned with stemming inflation caused by an increased money supply from Macedonian silver mining. The Macedonians continued minting silver coins between 167 and 148 BC, and when the Romans lifted the ban on Macedonian silver mining in 158 BC it may have only reflected the local reality of this illicit practice continuing regardless of the Senate's decree.

== See also ==
- Ancient Macedonians
- Ancient Macedonian dialect
- Demographic history of Macedonia
- History of Macedonia (ancient kingdom)
- List of ancient Macedonians
- Macedonians (Greeks)
- Rise of Macedon
