= Seleucid army =

4th-1st century BCE army

Seleucid Army
- Active: 312–63 BC
- Country: Seleucid Empire
- Role: Army of the Seleucid Empire under the Seleucid dynasty
- Size: 20,000 infantry, 12,000 cavalry and 480 war elephants (in battle of Ipsus, 301 BC); 62,000.and over 102 war elephants (c. 217 BC); 57,000–70,000 and over 54 war elephants (c. 190 BC)
- Engagements: Third War of the Diadochi; Babylonian War; Fourth War of the Diadochi; Seleucid–Mauryan war Galatian invasions Syrian Wars; Anabasis of Antiochus III; Seleucid–Parthian wars Roman–Seleucid War; Maccabean Revolt; Parthian War; Seleucid Dynastic Wars

Commanders
- Notable commanders: Seleucus I Nicator; Antiochus I Soter; Molon; Antiochus III the Great; Bacchides; Diodotus Tryphon

The Seleucid army was the army of the Seleucid Empire, the largest of the Hellenistic states that emerged after the death of Alexander the Great.

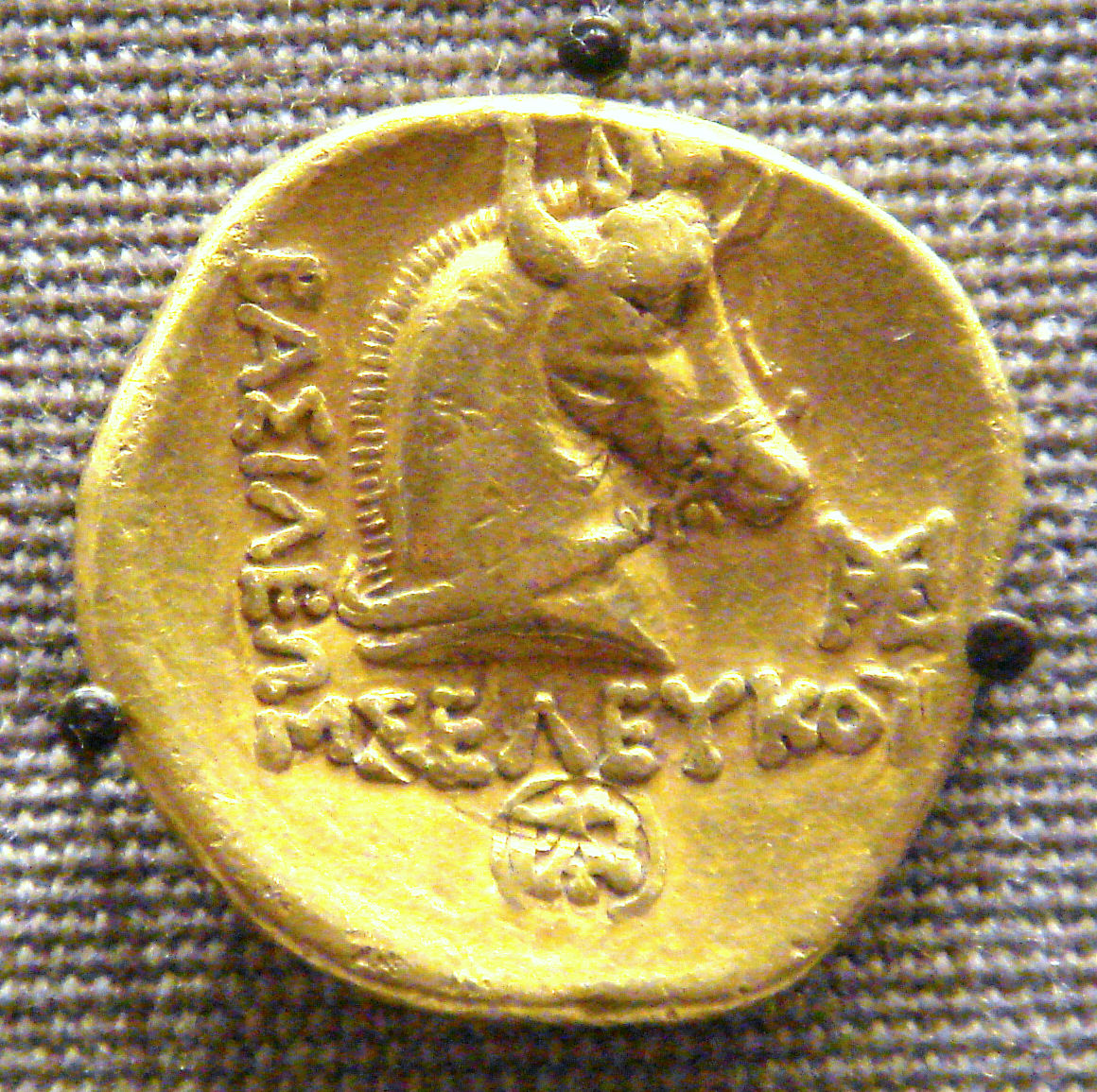
Seleucus I coin depicting Alexander the Great's horse Bucephalus.

As with the other major Hellenistic armies, the Seleucid army fought primarily in the Macedonian style, with its main body being the phalanx. The phalanx was a large, dense formation of men armed with small shields and a long pike called the sarissa. This form of fighting had been developed by the Macedonian army in the reign of Philip II of Macedon and his son Alexander the Great. Alongside the phalanx, the Seleucid armies used a great deal of native and mercenary troops to supplement their Greek forces, which were limited due to the distance from the Seleucid rulers' Macedonian homeland.

== Manpower ==
The distance from Greece put a strain on the Seleucid military system, as it was primarily based around the recruitment of Greeks as the key segment of the army. In order to increase the population of Greeks in their kingdom, the Seleucid rulers created military settlements. There were two main periods in the establishment of settlements, firstly under Seleucus I Nicator and Antiochus I Soter and then under Antiochus IV Epiphanes. The military settlers were given land, "varying in size according to rank and arm of service'. They were settled in 'colonies of an urban character, which at some point could acquire the status of a polis". Unlike the Ptolemaic military settlers, who were known as Kleruchoi, the Seleucid settlers were called Katoikoi. The settlers would maintain the land as their own and in return they would serve in the Seleucid army when called. The majority of settlements were concentrated in Lydia, northern Syria, the upper Euphrates and Media. The Greeks were dominant in Lydia, Phrygia and Syria. For example, Antiochus III brought Greeks from Euboea, Crete and Aetolia and settled them in Antioch.

These Greek settlers would be used to form the Seleucid phalanx and cavalry units, with picked men put into the kingdom's guards regiments. The rest of the Seleucid army would consist of a large number of native and mercenary troops, who would serve as light auxiliary troops. The government was leery of training and trusting non-Greek soldiers "too much" though, for fear of revolts against Greek rule. One of the most detailed reports of Seleucid manpower is from the historian Polybius, who recorded in detail units in a military parade in 166–165 BC at Daphne, near its capital Antioch. At the Daphne Parade, it was largely trusted Greek soldiers capable of being deployed anywhere on display, rather than "ethnic" contingents. This was most likely due to the army reform that was undertaken by Antiochus IV. In his reign, Antiochus IV had built 15 new cities "and their association with the increased phalanx... at Daphne is too obvious to be ignored".

== Infantry ==
=== Argyraspides ===
The principle guard infantry of the Seleucid army was the 'Silver-Shields', or Argyraspides. They were a permanently embodied guard unit, which was formed from the sons of military settlers. They were armed in the Macedonian manner with a sarissa and fought in the phalanx formation, much like the other Hellenistic armies of the time. The Argyraspides were probably a corps of about 10,000 men.

=== Agema of the hypaspists ===
The agema had a full name, the agema of the hypaspists. The absence of mention of them in detailed writings about the Seleucid campaigns may be due to their having retained only the second half of their name, being called the hypaspists. They formed a crack force within the infantry guardsmen corps. There were 1000 argyraspides of the royal guard at the right flank led by the king at the Battle of Magnesia in 190 BC.

=== Chrysaspides and Chalkaspides ===
The Seleucid phalanx may have been divided into corps, similar to a manner proposed of the Antigonid Macedonian army. Polybius's account of the Daphne parade is again the main source, but unfortunately the surviving fragment is only in a single manuscript and bears signs of a miscopying or lacuna. The surviving sentence says that 20,000 "Macedonians" were at the parade, 5,000 chalkaspides ('Bronze-Shields'), and agryaspides ('Silver-Shields'). The best guess at what the original sentence was by Georg Kaibel was that there were 20,000 Macedonians, divided into 10,000 chrysaspides (Greek: Χρυσάσπιδες 'Golden-Shields'), 5,000 chalkaspides, and the rest (the other 5,000) agryaspides. The existence of a separate corps of Golden-Shields is supported by a reading of 1 Maccabees that poetically refers to "shields of gold and brass" and some other scattered references in Greek literature, although is contested by some such as Nicholas Sekunda who argues that no such division existed, and the Seleucid phalanx in general were called 'silver-shields'.

=== 'Romanized' infantry ===
In 166 BC, at the Daphne Parade under Antiochus IV, the Argyraspides corps is only seen to be 5,000 strong. However, 5,000 troops armed in the Roman fashion are present and they are described as being in the prime of their life, perhaps denoting their elite nature. It is possible that the missing 5,000 men of the Argyraspides were the 5,000 'Romanized' infantry marching alongside them. The training of a segment of the royal guard in "Roman' methods was probably down to several factors. Firstly, Antiochus IV had 'spent part of his early life in Rome and had acquired rather an excessive admiration for Rome's power and methods". Secondly, the future wars that the Seleucids might be fighting would probably be in the eastern satrapies against mobile enemies and other large areas of land. Training troops in this way would add to the overall efficiency and capability of the army and make it more manoeuvrable. 'Romanized' troops were probably active in suppressing the Maccabean Revolt, such as their success at the Battle of Beth Zechariah in 162 BC. Thirdly, the defeat of the Antigonids at the Battle of Pydna in 168 BC was a great culture shock, showing the complete destruction of the Macedonian military system at the hands of the Roman legion.

=== Thorakitai ===
It has been suggested that the fact that these 5,000 men are marching at the head of the army was meant to show Antiochus IV's intention of reforming the entire Seleucid army along Roman lines, though whether or not this complete reform actually took place is unknown. The true extent of the adoption of Roman techniques is unknown, some have suggested that the infantry are in fact more likely to be Thureophoroi or Thorakitai, troops armed with an oval shield of the Celtic type, a thrusting spear and javelins.

=== Citizen militia ===
There was a militia, at least in Syria. They were from the Greek cities who had no specific role within the regular army. We do not find the militias involved in the great campaigns before the general decline of the kingdom, which occurred in the latter half of the second century BC. By then, many important military settlements had fallen to Pergamon and Parthia. In 148 BC, at the Battle of Azotos against the Maccabees, the Seleucid army was called the 'Power of the Cities', probably owing to the high proportion of citizen militia mobilized from the coastal cities. Citizens of Antioch played a major role in the overthrowing of Demetrius II Nicator. Demetrius, having taken the throne, decided to disband the majority of the regular army and reduce its pay by a large amount. In place of the regular army, Demetrius' power rested with his Greek, especially Cretan, mercenaries in what was known as the 'Cretan Tyranny'. Not long after, the majority of the citizen militia was wiped out in Antiochus VII's disastrous Parthian War of 129 BC. The militia were most likely armed and fought in the style of the Thureophoroi.

=== Allied, vassal and mercenary infantry ===
Due to the lack of Greeks in the lands of the Seleucid kingdom, the use of allied, vassal and mercenary troops was great. They were often used as light and auxiliary troops, supplementing the phalanx and cavalry. Large numbers of native contingents fought at the Battle of Raphia in 217 BC. Among them were 10,000 Arab infantry, 5,000 Dahai, Carmanians and Cilicians. Certain ethnic contingents, be they vassal or mercenary, were of considerable use. For example, Thracian mercenaries along with Mysian, Cilician, Lycian, and Vassal troops from the mountainous areas of the empire were used by Antiochus III in conjunction with Thorakitai in his storming of the Elburz range in 210 BC. The Persian and Iranian troops were most likely of a higher professional military standing than most of the other contingents, as they are seen on garrison duty throughout the empire. In the review at Daphne in 166 BC, the large numbers of allied and vassal contingents are missing. They were of doubtful reliability, usefulness and efficiency. So much so that Appian blamed them for the defeat at the Battle of Magnesia in 190 BC. The absence of auxiliaries from the army of Antiochus IV may have contributed to its strength. Making up for the loss of ethnic contingents, the army was supplemented by mercenaries, who were more experienced and better trained. The Thracian and Galatian mercenaries at Daphne would have been of good use in campaigns in the rough, hilly terrain. For example, the arms and equipment of the Thracian troops allowed the individual soldier greater mobility and freer action in hand-to-hand combat than a phalangite could adopt.

== Cavalry ==
Unlike the more westerly powers, like the Romans and other Greek states, where infantry dominated the battlefield, in the 'vast spaces to the east, the horse cultures were more influential'. Speed and mobility were the key, especially when dealing with foes like the Parthians and the Greco-Bactrians. The Parthian style of warfare was based around heavily armoured cavalrymen, Cataphracts, and horse archers, which were used in hit and run style tactics. The eastern style of horse warfare would have a deep impact in the reign of Antiochus III, when he armed his heavy cavalry along Parthian lines. However, unfortunately for the Seleucids, their main rivals, the Romans and Ptolemies, used armies that were centered around a core of good infantry. In this sense, there was a sense of the overvaluing of cavalry as an offensive arm. Antiochus III was an excellent cavalry commander, his assault at Tapuria in 208 BC as described by Polybius could almost act as a 'military treatise on how to conduct a cavalry battle'. However, Antiochus III was not as apt when dealing with infantry, be it Greek or Roman. At Magnesia, Antiochus' disregard for his phalanx and his misdirected cavalry charge led to his defeat. The Seleucid cavalry, after the introduction of the Cataphract, can be sub-divided into several categories. Firstly, there were the heavy cavalry of which there were Kataphraktoi (armoured) and Aphraktoi (unarmoured). The Aphraktoi were divided into two groups, lancer and missile troops. The lancers, who performed the job of heavy cavalry before the Cataphract, were known by numerous names, for example dorataphoroi, sarissaphoroi, kontophoroi, xystophoroi and lonchophoroi. Xystophoroi and lonchophoroi were mentioned specifically by Titus Flamininus whilst in discussion with the Achaeans. The light cavalry was used to skirmish, so troops such as those that fought in the Tarentine style were common within this category, although there were numerous native contingents too.

=== Agema, Hetairoi and Nisaioi ===
Along with the guard infantry unit, there were two guard cavalry regiments, each 1,000 strong. These were the Agema (the 'Guards') and the Hetairoi ('Companions'). The Hetairoi were recruited from the younger generation of military settlers and acted as the standing guard cavalry unit of the army, serving in peace and in war. However, it seems that writers referred to them by several names other than just the 'companions'; the basilike ile ('royal squadron' or 'regia ala' according to Livy), and the hippos hetairike ('horse companions'). Bar-Kochva presumes that from this their full title may well have been the 'royal ala of the companions'. The Agema 'consisted of Medes, selected men, with a mixture of horsemen of many races from the same part of the world. Both corps of cavalry could escort the king into battle, or both could be brigaded together into one unit of 2,000. Both units were armed with a xyston, a cavalry lance not so dissimilar to the sarissa. They were also equipped with a cuirass and helmet. After the introduction of the Cataphract, the Hetairoi were given similar but lighter protection. As for the Agema, they were probably equipped the same as the cataphracts. Another regiment of horse that was similarly armed to the cataphracts was the Nisian cavalry (Nisaioi), which was composed of Iranians.

=== Epilektoi ===
At the Daphne parade, there was also a regiment of 'picked', known as Epilektoi, horsemen, numbering 1,000. The Epilektoi were most likely recruited from the city of Larissa, which was founded by colonists from Larissa on the Greek mainland. After the loss of Media, the main recruiting ground for the Agema, to the Parthians, the Epilektoi were given the title and role of the Agema by Alexander Balas.

=== Kataphraktoi ===
Despite the prospect of a mobile cavalry phalanx, the cavalry still faced problems. The xyston was still too short to meet the sarissa phalanx head on. The weight of their armour restricted movement, but the elimination of a shield for protection made the rider and horse more vulnerable. The desire to meet the phalanx head on and the need for protection was remedied after the anabasis of Antiochus III to the eastern satrapies in 210-206 BC. At this time, Antiochus came into contact with the Parthian cavalry, of which some were heavily armed with scale armour for both the rider and horse and longer lances known as a kontos. The kontos 'almost equalled the phalangite sarissa'. The cataphract had numerous advantages though. First, their armour provided protection from missiles, arrows, spears and pikes. Second, the kontos allowed them to block an enemy advance and attack from further away. For example, the Seleucid cataphracts were able to beat the Ptolemaic cavalry and attack their phalanx at Panium in 200 BC with relative ease. Nevertheless, they still had their problems. Like the phalanx, an attack on their flank could prove fatal for the rider and these difficulties were exploited by infantry 'which assaulted the cataphracts from the flanks, attacking body parts of the riders and horses that were unprotected by armour'. The cataphracts could also have their kontos grabbed from them or be knocked off their horse. In order to remedy this, semi-heavy cavalry were needed to watch their flanks.

While the Seleucid cataphracts were certainly of Greek or Persian descent, Livy describes a contingent of 3,000 cavalry "clad in mail armour and known as 'cataphracti'" present at the Battle of Magnesia, standing next to a contingent of Galatian infantry, which Appian later also describe being of Galatian descent.

=== Politikoi ===
Along with the citizen militia infantry, there were also militia cavalry units recruited in the cities, known as Politikoi. This cavalry consisted of those richest citizens who did not hold the legal status of 'Macedonians'. Citizen cavalry of this sort was seen at the Daphne parade and, in this case, was probably just from Antioch and not collected from all of the coastal cities. The Politikoi was probably not organised into regiments; instead, it was likely that it comprised a collection of separate squadrons, with each squadron having its own distinctive dress and equipment.

=== Tarantine cavalry ===
The Seleucids employed a number of Tarantine cavalry, either as mercenaries or – more likely – equipped and trained in the "Tarantine fashion". They were present at the Battle of Panium and the Battle of Magnesia.

=== Dromedaries ===
Camels are attested in use in the Seleucid army at the battle of Magnesia, but their small number (500) suggests they were not a regular addition. According to Xenophon, their scent scared off horses.

=== Allied, vassal and mercenary cavalry ===
The Seleucids fielded several types of mercenary, vassal and allied cavalry. At the Battle of Magnesia Antiochus deployed Dahae horse archers, Gallograecian (Galatian) cavalry and camel-borne Arab archers. Appian later also identifies Mysian and Elymais horse archers in that battle, which Livy said to be foot archers.

== War Elephants ==
Seleucus brought 480 Indian war elephants at the battle of Ipsus.

== Major battles ==
- Battle of Ipsus
- Battle of Corupedium
- Battle of Raphia
- Battle of Mount Labus
- Battle of the Arius
- Siege of Bactra
- Battle of Mount Labus
- Battle of Panium
- Battle of Thermopylae (191 BC)
- Battle of Magnesia
- Battle of the Oenoparus
- Battle of Ecbatana

== Bibliography ==
Ancient sources

- Polybius, The Histories
- Livy, The History of Rome
- Appian, Syrian Wars

Modern sources

- Astin, A.E., Frederiksen, M.W., Ogilvie, R.M., Walbank, F.W. (eds.) (1984), The Cambridge Ancient History: Volume VII
- Beston, Paul (2002), Review, The Classical Review, New Series, Vol.52, No.2, p. 388-389
- Chaniotis, Angelos (2006), "War in the Hellenistic World"
- Gaebel, Robert E. (2002), Cavalry Operations in the Ancient Greek World
- Griffith, G.T. (1935), The Mercenaries of the Hellenistic World
- Sekunda, Nicholas (1994). Seleucid and Ptolemaic Reformed Armies 168-145 BC, Volume 1: The Seleucid Army. Angus McBride (illustrator). Montvert Publications.
- Sekunda, Nicholas Victor (2001). Hellenistic Infantry Reform in the 160's BC. Studies on the History of Ancient and Medieval Art of Warfare 5. Oficyna Naukowa MS. ISBN 83-85874-04-6.
- Sherwin-White, Susan; Kuhrt, Amélie (1993). From Samarkhand to Sardis: A New Approach to the Seleucid Empire. Berkeley: University of California Press.
- Bar-Kochva, Bezalel (1979) [1976]. The Seleucid Army. Cambridge University Press. ISBN 9780521206679.
- Bar-Kochva, Bezalel (1989). Judas Maccabaeus: The Jewish Struggle Against the Seleucids. Cambridge University Press. ISBN 978-0-521-32352-9.
- Head, Duncan (1982), Armies of the Macedonian and Punic Wars 359 BC to 146 BC
- Bevan, Edwyn Robert, (1902), The House of Seleucus, Vol. II
- Tarn, W.W. (1980) [1922], The Greeks in Bactria and India
