= Chalkaspides =

Term for a Macedonian-style phalanx

Chalkaspides (Greek: Χαλκάσπιδες, lit. 'Bronze Shields') is a poetic term used by writers of Koine Greek to refer to a Macedonian phalanx. The most notable group called chalkaspides was the main phalanx force of the Antigonid Macedonian army in the Hellenistic period. The group were hoplites who fought in phalanx formation using long sarissas and bronze shields, either a pelta or an aspis. They may have been supplemented by another Antigonid force called the Leukaspides ("White Shields") when more manpower was necessary, although the leukaspides are less well-attested to in ancient sources. The leukaspides may have been very similar to the chalkaspides and also fought as a phalanx, or they might be a term for non-Macedonian allies and mercenaries who used wooden thyreos shields rather than the bronze pelta.

King Antigonus Doson armed the citizens of Megalopolis as "Bronze Shields" for the Sellasia campaign in 222 BC. These units fought in the various Macedonian Wars against the Roman Republic. Plutarch records 1,200 wagons filled with bronze shields taken as spoils after the Roman victory at the Battle of Pydna in 168 BC, presumably from the defeated chalkaspides.

The term Chalkaspides is found in other Hellenistic armies, as well. The historian Polybius records a military parade by the Seleucid army of the Seleucid Empire at Daphne, a suburb of Antioch, in 165 BCE. The Seleucid phalanx seems to have been formed into two corps: 10,000 Chrysaspides (Greek: Χρυσάσπιδες "Golden Shields") and 5,000 Chalkaspides. While the Seleucids clearly heavily used phalanxes in their wars, if a separate corps was meant by Polybius with the reference to chalkaspides, little else is known specifically about that corps. A reference in 1 Maccabees refers to bronze shields present at the Battle of Beth Zechariah in 162 BC.

The Achaean League's phalanx are also sometimes called chalkaspides. Plutarch writes of Mithridates VI of Pontus fielding a corps of chalkaspides against Sulla at the Battle of Chaeronea (86 BCE).

== See also ==
- Argyraspides

== Bibliography ==
- Plutarch. Parallel Lives. Aemilius Paullus, c. 20, Sulla, c. 16 & c. 19
- Sekunda, Nicholas Victor (2001). Hellenistic Infantry Reform in the 160's BC. Studies on the History of Ancient and Medieval Art of Warfare, v. 5. Oficyna Naukowa.
- Sekunda, Nicholas Victor (2013). The Antigonid Army. Akanthina No. 8. Gdańsk: University of Gdańsk. ISBN 978-83-7531-266-9.
