= Antigonid Macedonian army =

Army of Macedon under the Antigonids

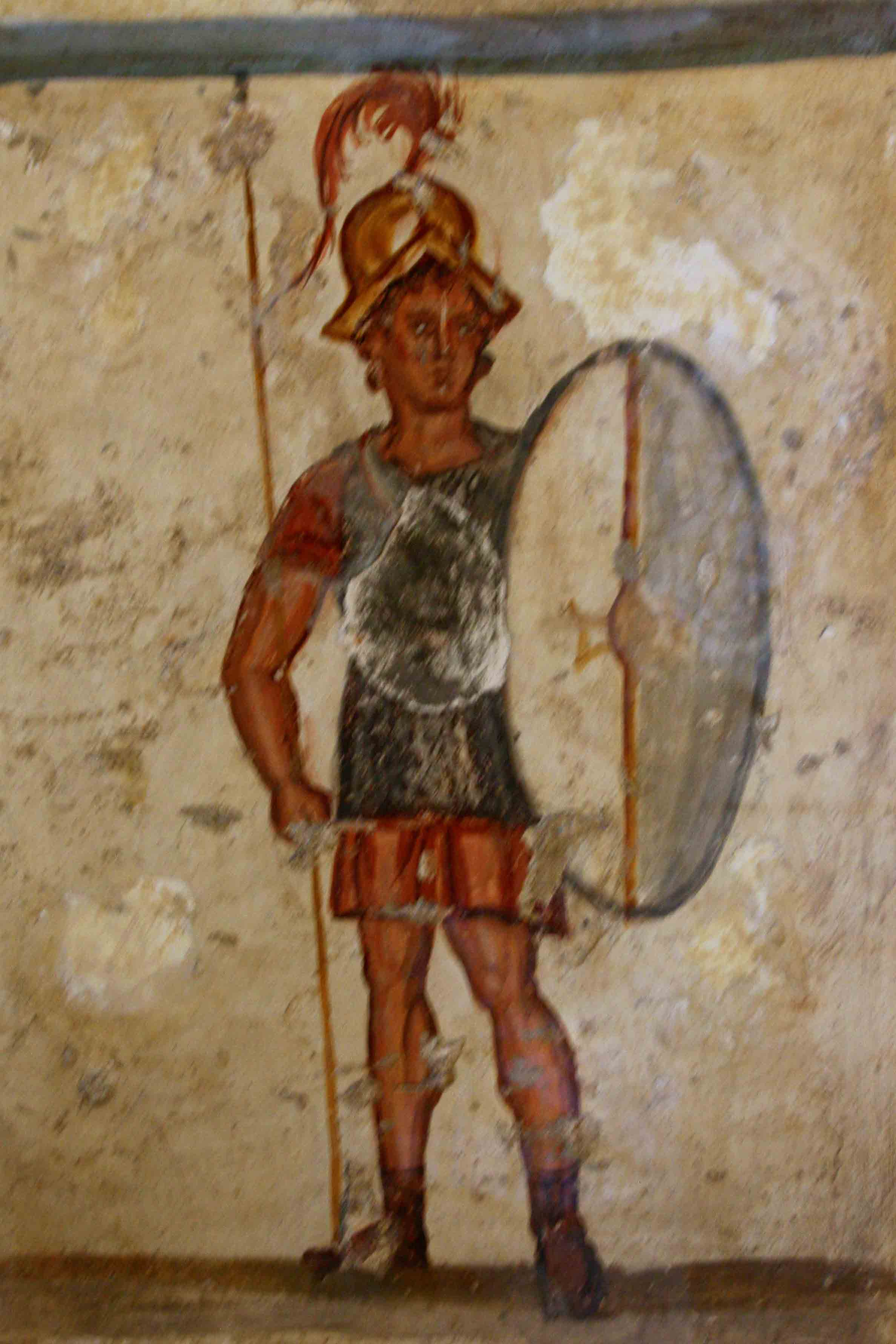
- Fresco of an Ancient Macedonian soldier (thorakitai) wearing chainmail armor and bearing a thureos shield, 3rd century BC; Archeological Museum in Istanbul.
- Active: 294-288 BC and 276-168 BC
- Country: Antigonid Macedon
- Role: Army of Macedonia under the Antigonid dynasty
- Size: 18,600 (c. 222 BC); 25,500 (c. 197 BC); 43,000 (c. 172 BC)
- Engagements: Chremonidean War; Cleomenean War; Social War (220–217 BC); First Macedonian War; Cretan War; Second Macedonian War; Aetolian War; War against Nabis; Third Macedonian War

Commanders
- Notable commanders: Demetrius Poliorcetes; Antigonus Gonatas; Antigonus Doson; Philip V of Macedon; Perseus of Macedon

The Antigonid Macedonian army was the army of the ancient Greek kingdom of Macedonia in the period when it was ruled by the Antigonid dynasty from 294 BC to 288 BC and from 276 BC to 168 BC. It was seen as one of the principal Hellenistic fighting forces until its ultimate defeat at Roman hands at the Battle of Pydna in 168 BC. However, there was a brief resurgence in 150-148 during the revolt of Andriscus, a supposed heir to Perseus.

Starting as just a mere handful of mercenary troops under Antigonus Gonatas in the 270s BC, the Antigonid army eventually became the dominant force in Hellenistic Greece, fighting campaigns against Epirus, the Aetolian League, Sparta, Athens, Rhodes and Pergamon, not to mention the numerous Thracian and Celtic tribes that threatened Macedon from the north.

The Antigonid army, as with the army of Philip II and Alexander the Great that came before it, was based principally around the Macedonian phalanx, which was a solid formation of men armed with small shields and long pikes called sarissae. The majority of Macedonian troops serving in the army would have made up the numbers of the phalanx, which took up to one-third to two-thirds of the entire army on campaign. Alongside the phalanx, the Antigonid army had its elite corps, the Peltasts, numerous Macedonian and allied cavalry and always a considerable amount of allied and mercenary infantry and auxiliary troops, but it relied more on the phalanx and less on the combined arms tactics of Philip's and Alexander's Macedonian army.

== Background and sources ==
The Macedonian army continued to evolve under the Antigonid dynasty. It is uncertain how many men were appointed as somatophylakes bodyguards, which numbered eight men at the end of Alexander the Great's reign, while the hypaspistai seem to have morphed into assistants of the somatophylakes rather than a separate unit in their own right. At the Battle of Cynoscephalae in 197 BC, the Macedonians commanded some 16,000 phalanx pikemen. Alexander the Great's 'royal squadron' of companion cavalry were similarly numbered to the 800 cavalrymen of the 'sacred squadron' (Latin: sacra ala; Greek: hiera ile) commanded by Philip V of Macedon during the Social War of 219 BC. Due to the Roman historian Livy's accounts of the battles of Callinicus in 171 BC and Pydna in 168 BC, it is known that the Macedonian cavalry were also divided into groups with similarly named officers as had existed in Alexander's day. The regular Macedonian cavalry numbered 3,000 at Callinicus, which was separate from the 'sacred squadron' and 'royal cavalry'. Thanks to contemporary inscriptions from Amphipolis and Greia dated 218 and 181 respectively, historians have been able to partially piece together the organization of the Antigonid army under Philip V, such as its command by tetrarchai officers assisted by grammateis (i.e. secretaries or clerks).

== Antigonid army under Antigonus Gonatas ==
When Antigonus Gonatas took over from his father, Demetrius I of Macedon, he inherited little more than a few mercenary garrisons spread across Greece. But using his mercenary forces, he was able to defeat an invading Celtic army at Lysimachea in 277 BC. This gave Gonatas the Macedonian throne, which had been in turmoil since the Galatian invasions of 279 BC. However, when Pyrrhus of Epirus invaded Macedon in 274 BC, Antigonus' army suffered some minor defeats and desertions before eventually defecting en masse to Pyrrhus. Once again Gonatas was left with but a mere handful of followers and mercenaries. These forces were of considerable aid to Sparta when Pyrrhus assaulted the city in 272 BC. Pyrrhus was soon killed by a combined effort of the Spartans, the Argives and Antigonus Gonatas. Having now recovered Macedon after the death of Pyrrhus, Gonatas ruled until 239 BC. At this point, the Antigonid kingdom probably had no standing army; the only permanent corps, besides the mercenaries, being the 'horse guards... and the foot guards, the agema'. The army was probably formed by a levy of farmers called out when a serious campaign was expected. Almost all overseas and garrison work was performed by mercenaries. Due to the financial strains that plagued the kingdom, Gonatas primarily hired Galatian and Celtic mercenaries, as they were much cheaper than Greeks. Antigonus Gonatas ruled directly over the original Macedonian kingdom, however he put the newly acquired territory under the control of a strategoi with military powers. By the time of his death, Gonatas had cemented Antigonid dominance in Macedon; however, in Greece itself, Macedon was weaker than it had been under Alexander the Great. This would change with his successors though.

== Antigonid army under Antigonus Doson ==
Demetrius II, father of the future Philip V of Macedon, only ruled for 10 years, but in his reign he fought many campaigns against the northern Thracian, Celtic and Illyrian tribes as well as an Achaean-Aetolian alliance. However his swift death left Antigonus Doson as regent for the young Philip. A resurgent Sparta under Cleomenes III led to war in the Peloponnese and the Achaean League under Aratus of Sicyon turned to Antigonus Doson for help. Doson campaigned against Cleomenes in 224-22 BC. This culminated with the Battle of Sellasia in 222 BC, in which Cleomenes was defeated by an allied army, mainly anchored by a Macedonian army of 13,300 Macedonians and 5,300 mercenaries.

== Antigonid army during the Macedonian Wars ==
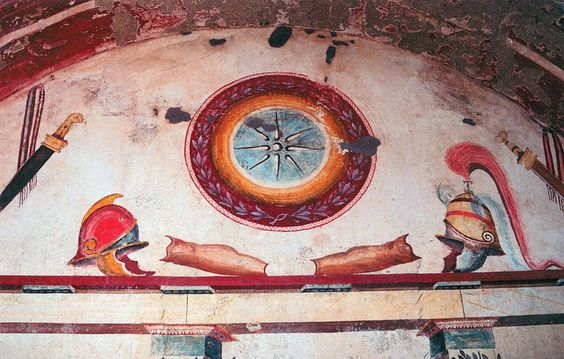
Ancient Macedonian paintings of Hellenistic-era military armor, arms, and gear from the Tomb of Lyson and Kallikles in ancient Mieza (modern-day Lefkadia), Imathia, Central Macedonia, Greece, dated 2nd century BC.

After the death of Doson, Philip V took the throne and almost immediately began to campaign. Wars against the Aetolia, Sparta and Elis, as well as a Dardanian invasion kept Philip busy in the years 220-217 BC and gave him a great deal of military experience. Yet Philip's rule would be marked by war with Rome, which culminated with a treaty with Carthage which led to the First Macedonian War. The first war ended in a stalemate and the Peace of Phoinike, which allowed Philip to keep his newly acquired land from his campaigns against the Aetolians, Rome's ally. Between 205 and 201/200 BC Philip used the peace to reorganize his army recruitment system and introduce new strict disciplinary codes for the army.

Peace did not last and an alliance with Antiochus III of the Seleucid Empire, which allowed Philip to campaign in Asia Minor, led to an alliance of Pergamon, Athens and Rhodes who appealed to Rome for help. By 199 BC, the Romans had inflicted some minor defeats on the Macedonians and had also recruited the Aetolian and Achaean Leagues to their side. An army under Titus Quinctius Flamininus was sent to Greece and campaigned against Philip V in 198 BC in the Aous Valley, which Philip defended by using carefully placed artillery and missile troops, leading to many Roman casualties. Using a flanking maneuver, Flaminius managed to dislodge Philip and chase him into Thessaly, where in 197 BC the two sides met at the Battle of Cynoscephalae. Here, Philip was decisively beaten, with 8,000 of his men killed and 5,000 taken prisoner, about half of his entire army.

The defeat left Philip with a weakened kingdom. Consequently, the king set about a system of reforms and reorganized his kingdom, especially in increasing his manpower base for future campaigns. He encouraged large families and imported Thracians from districts he had recently annexed into Macedon proper. Thus, in the autumn of 187 BC, Philip transported segments of the populations of the coastal towns and cities to the northern Paeonian frontier and then moved Thracians and so forth into the evacuated districts of the towns. This 'Macedonised' the frontier and also made it easier to defend. The Thracians moved to the cities and towns were people directly responsible to Philip as king and also a useful force to watch over suspect citizens. New mines were created, old ones were deepened and agricultural and harbour duties were increased to increase the kingdom's revenue.

Overall, these social and economic moves strengthened the kingdom by Philip's death and the accession of his son Perseus of Macedon. By the eve of the Third Macedonian War, Perseus, thanks to his father, had enough grain to last the army 10 years without drawing on harvests in or outside Macedon, enough money to hire 10,000 mercenaries for 10 years, a fully reconstituted army and "arms for three such armies as Perseus possessed in his armouries". In fact, when Aemilius Paullus, the Roman commander who defeated Perseus at Pydna in 168 BC, took the Antigonid royal treasury, he found 6,000 talents left. The army fielded by Perseus in the Third Macedonian war was 43,000 strong, 29,000 of them Macedonians. Compare this to the army of Doson at Sellasia, which had 13,300 Macedonians, or the army of Philip at Cynoscephalae (18,000 Macedonian foot, 2,000 cavalry and 5,500 mercenaries). The years of peace and consolidation had increased the national levy by 9,000 men. However, at the Battle of Pydna in 168 BC, Perseus was severely defeated, with the loss of 20-25,000 killed and 11,000 captured. After this defeat, the Antigonid kingdom was quickly disbanded, with Perseus becoming a Roman prisoner and Macedonia being split up into several autonomous republics.

=== Amphipolis military codes ===
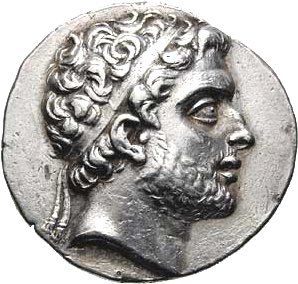
Coin of Philip V of Macedon

Sometime around the beginning of the second century BC, Philip V introduced a set of new codes for discipline in his army - the Amphipolis codes. As an example, these new measures included fines for missing equipment and weaponry: two obols for not having the konos (helmet), 3 obols for missing a sarissa and a drachma for missing the shield. We also know from this code that the ordinary phalangite would have been equipped with a leather or linen jerkin known as a linothorax and not a full metal cuirass, as the fines for missing cuirasses are limited to officers only. They also dealt with the organization of encampments. Hypaspists were to set up their tents "immediately after those of the king and his immediate entourage".

=== Antigonid peltasts and the agema ===
The most elite, veteran Antigonid-period Macedonian infantry from at least the time of Antigonus III Doson were the peltasts, lighter and more maneuverable soldiers wielding peltai javelins, swords, and a smaller bronze shield than Macedonian phalanx pikemen. They sometimes served as a more mobile phalanx, using smaller sarissas rather than swords. The premier guard infantry unit of the regular army, they are not to be confused with the skirmisher troops of the same name, denoted by their shield, the pelte. Among the peltasts, roughly 2,000 men were selected to serve in the elite agema vanguard, with other peltasts numbering roughly 3,000. The amount of peltasts varied over time, perhaps never more than 5,000 men (the largest figure mentioned by ancient historians, an amount that existed in the Social War of 219 BC). They fought alongside the phalanx pikemen, notably the chalkaspides ('bronze shields'), up until the very end of the kingdom in 168 BC.

Malcolm Errington writes that by the time of Antigonus III, the peltastai formed a separate unit from the Macedonian phalanx and "operated as a form of royal guard similar in function to the earlier hypaspistai." According to Walbank the peltast corps was "an infantry force... which fought beside the phalanx in battle, but at other times employed for ambushes, forced marches and special expeditions". Examples of their special actions would be their ambush in Lyncestis and their use, as shock troops, in the storming of Cephallenia. At Pydna, the corps fought as part of the phalanx, in which they were butchered to the last man. The Peltast corps was probably 5,000 strong, with an elite battalion of 2,000 called the agema. The corps was probably organized into chiliarchiai and subdivided like those of the phalanx.

As for term Hypaspist, it still lived on in the army. However, instead of a combat unit, it was a staff corps and bodyguard force for the king. For instance, a Hypaspist was sent by Philip V to Larissa to burn state papers after the defeat at Cynoscephalae.

=== Chalkaspides and Leukaspides ===
Like Alexander's phalanx, the phalanx of the Antigonids was mainly based on men "enrolled territorially from the Macedonian peasantry". "Barbarians" settled in Macedon, like the Thracians and so forth, were given land in return for serving in the phalanx. The phalanx under the Antigonids made up a much higher proportion of the army than under Alexander. At Sellasia, it was 34% of the army (with 10,000 men reported in the phalanx), at Cynoscephalae it was 62% and at Pydna it was 49%. The Antigonid phalanx itself may have been divided into two separate corps, the Chalkaspides ("bronze-shields") and Leukaspides ("white-shields"). The Chalkaspides were probably more prepared for prolonged combat service than the Leukaspides as they are sometimes found on distant expeditions without the other corps. The leukaspides are referred to rarely in sources, suggesting that they may have been a supplemental force only raised in times of need. Nicholas Victor Sekunda suggests an alternate view, that the leukaspides were not a phalanx force, but rather a term used to describe non-Macedonian auxiliaries and mercenaries such as Thracians, reported as using white shields in other sources, but not always fighting in the style of a Macedonian phalanx.

=== Cavalry ===
The importance and proportion of cavalry in the Antigonid army was far less than in Alexander's army. Whereas the proportion of cavalry to infantry in Alexander's army was about 1:6, in the later Antigonid armies the proportion was about 1:20. However, we must remember that Philip II had a similar proportion of cavalry to infantry and the reasoning for the higher amounts of mounted forces in Alexander's campaigns was due to the vast distance of territory needed to be travelled, especially in Persia. In Alexander's campaigns, swift advances and the ability to cover vast distances were the key to success. In comparison, for the Antigonid commanders, the lack of any real enemy cavalry and short distances meant cavalry were not needed as much and they reverted to pitched heavy infantry battle. Antigonus III Doson had only 300 Macedonian horse with him at Sellasia in 222 BC, though by the reign of Philip V the amount of cavalry had increased, with Philip fielding about 2,000 Macedonian and Thessalian horse in 197 BC. A sizeable part of the Macedonian cavalry was actually supplied by Thessaly, whose city-states continued to supply horse for the Antigonid kings as they had for Alexander and his father. However, the use of Thessalian cavalry decreased in 196 BC, when the Romans, triumphant after Cynoscephalae, gave parts of Macedonian Thessaly to their allies, the Aetolians. Perseus, due to his father's extensive recruitment drive and a period of 30 years of peace, was able to field 3,000 purely Macedonian cavalry to serve with him in the Third Macedonian War. The core guard cavalry unit was the small royal or 'sacred' squadron. This unit seems to have been between 300 and 400 strong, as Doson had that amount with him at Sellasia and Philip V had 400 'household' cavalry with him on his campaigns. Due to the general lack of native horse, the Macedonians usually supplemented their cavalry with that of allies and mercenaries. At Sellasia, alongside Doson's 300, there were 600 allied and 300 mercenary cavalry. Meanwhile, at Pydna, Perseus had a 1,000 picked allied Thracian horse under Cotys IV, the king of the Odrysai. The infantry phalanx depended heavily on the cavalry, which of course the Antigonids lacked in numbers. The weakness and neglect of forces on the flanks, most importantly cavalry forces, led to the exploitation of gaps in the phalanx at Cynoscephalae and Pydna.

== Antigonid Navy ==
=== Navy of Demetrius Poliorcetes ===
Following the initiative of Philip II, Macedonian kings continued to expand and equip the navy (Cassander maintained a small fleet at Pydna).

Demetrius I Poliorcetes commanded large fleets at the victorious naval Battle of Salamis (306 BC) against the Ptolemies and at the unsuccessful Siege of Rhodes (305–304 BC). Demetrius continued to have a navy, with a fleet at Pella, when he took the throne of Macedon.

=== Navy of Antigonid Macedon ===
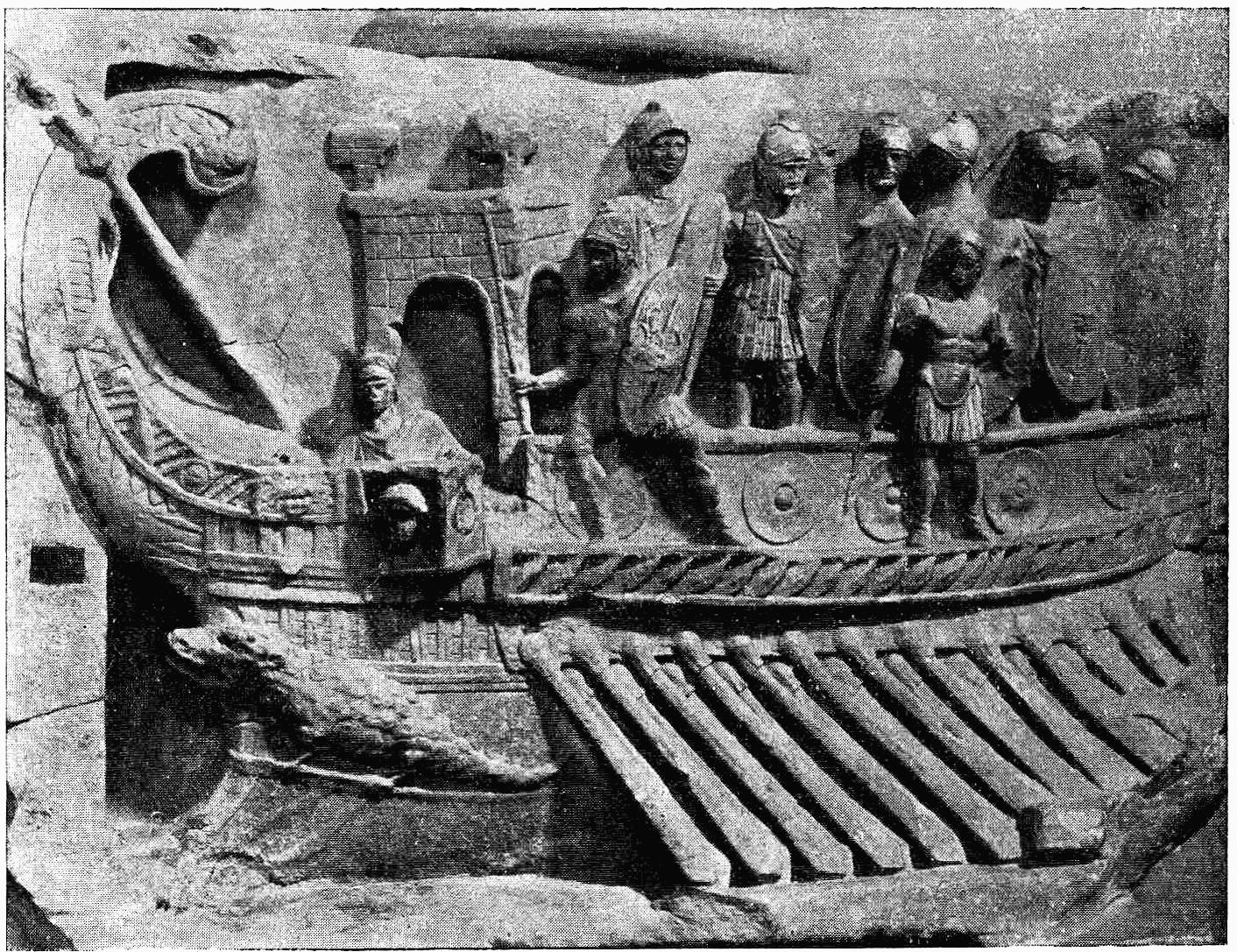
A Roman naval bireme depicted in a relief from the Temple of Fortuna Primigenia in Praeneste (Palastrina), which was built c. 120 BC; Museo Pio-Clementino, Vatican Museums.

Demetrius' son, Antigonus II Gonatas, while serving as a general for him in Greece, used the navy to secure the Antigonid holdings in Demetrias, Chalkis, Piraeus, and Corinth. The navy was considerably expanded during the Chremonidean War (267–261 BC), allowing the Macedonian navy to defeat the Ptolemaic navy at the 255 BC Battle of Cos and 245 BC Battle of Andros, and enabling Macedonian influence to spread over the Cyclades. Antigonus III Doson used the Macedonian navy to invade Caria, while Philip V allegedly sent two-hundred ships, some of them captured from the Ptolemies, to fight in the (unsuccessful) Battle of Chios in 201 BC. The Macedonian navy was reduced to a mere six vessels as agreed in the 197 BC peace treaty that concluded the Second Macedonian War with the Roman Republic, although Perseus of Macedon quickly assembled some lemboi at the outbreak of the Third Macedonian War in 171 BC.

== Major battles ==
- Battle of Lysimachia
- Battle of the Aous (274 BC)
- Siege of Sparta
- Battle of Argos
- Battle of Cos
- Battle of Andros (246 BC)
- Battle of Sellasia
- Lyttian War
- First Battle of Lamia
- Second Battle of Lamia
- Battle of Chios (201 BC)
- Battle of Lade (201 BC)
- Battle of the Aous (198 BC)
- Battle of Cynoscephalae
- Battle of Callinicus
- Battle of Uskana (169 BC)
- Siege of Aiginion
- Battle of Pydna

== The army of Andriscus ==
In 149 BC, nearly 20 years after the defeat of Perseus at Pydna, Andriscus, a mercenary and supposed heir to Perseus, went to Demetrius I of Syria for aid, but was sent as a prisoner to Rome. He quickly made his escape and sought refuge amongst the Thracian tribes to the north of Macedon. There, Andriscus gained the support of the Thracian king Teres III and was given a troop of 100 men, with another 100 sent by other Thracian chieftains. Andriscus quickly defeated the forces of the several autonomous Macedonian republics in battle beyond the Strymon in the lands of the Odomanti tribe. The Thracian troops of Andriscus would have primarily been Peltast skirmisher infantry and light cavalry. Andriscus, having established himself as the new king of Macedon, under the name Philip VI, decisively defeated a Roman army under Publius Juventius. Having defeated the Romans, Andriscus invaded Thessaly in 148 BC, where he suffered a setback in battle against the Achaean League, commanded by Scipio Nasica. A Roman army under Quintus Caecilius Metellus then invaded Macedon and defeated Andriscus at the Second Battle of Pydna. The defeat was probably helped by the defection of Telestes, the general appointed by Andriscus to command his cavalry. The Macedonian aristocratic cavalry joined Telestes, as the richer classes supported the Romans more than they did Andriscus, and any hope of success was dead.

== See also ==
- Diadochi
- Hellenistic period

== Bibliography ==
=== Ancient sources ===
- Diodorus Siculus, Bibliotheca Historica
- Livy, The History of Rome
- Plutarch, Parallel Lives: "Life of Pyrrhus"; "Life of Flamininus"; "Life of Cleomenes"; "Life of Aemilius Paullus"
- Polybius, Histories

=== Modern sources ===
- Chaniotis, Angelos (2006), "War in the Hellenistic World"
- Cary, M. (1978), "A History of the Greek World 323 to 146 BC"
- Coarelli, Filippo (1987). I Santuari del Lazio in età repubblicana (1st ed.). Rome: NIS.
- Connolly, Peter (2006) [1998]. Greece and Rome at War.
- Errington, Robert Malcolm (1990). A History of Macedonia. Translated by Catherine Errington. Berkeley, Los Angeles, & Oxford: University of California Press. ISBN 0-520-06319-8.
- Errington, R. Malcolm (2008), "A History of the Hellenistic World 323-30 BC"
- Hammond, N.G.L (1965), "The Opening Campaigns and the Battle of the Aoi Stena in the Second Macedonian War", JRS, Vol.56, p. 39-54
- Hammond, N.G.L (1984), "The Battle of Pydna", JHS, Vol.104, p. 31-47
- Hammond, N.G.L (1988), "The Campaign and the Battle of Cynoscephale in 197 BC", JHS, Vol.108, p. 60-82
- Hammond, N.G.L & Walbank, F.W. (1988), "A History of Macedonia: Volume III, 336-167 BC"
- Hammond, N.G.L (1989), "The Macedonian State"
- Head, Duncan (1982), "Armies of the Macedonian and Punic Wars 359 BC to 146 BC"
- Heckel, Waldemar & Jones, Ryan (2006), "Macedonian Warrior"
- Morgan, J.D. (1981), "Sellasia Revisited", AJA, Vol.85, No.3, p. 328-330
- Penrose, Jane (2005), "Rome and her Enemies: An Empire created and destroyed by War"
- Saddington, D. B. (2011) [2007]. "Classes: the Evolution of the Roman Imperial Fleets". In Erdkamp, Paul (ed.). A Companion to the Roman Army. Oxford, Chichester, & Malden: Wiley-Blackwell. pp. 201–217. ISBN 978-1-4051-2153-8.
- Sekunda, Nicholas Viktor (1995). Seleucid and Ptolemaic Reformed Armies 168-145 BC, Volume 2: The Ptolemaic Army.
- Sekunda, Nicholas Viktor (2010). "The Macedonian Army". In Roisman, Joseph; Worthington, Ian (eds.). A Companion to Ancient Macedonia. Oxford, Chichester, & Malden: Wiley-Blackwell. pp. 446–471. ISBN 978-1-4051-7936-2.
- Sekunda, Nicholas Victor (2013). The Antigonid Army. Akanthina No. 8. Gdańsk: University of Gdańsk.
- Tarn, W.W. (1913), "Antigonos Gonatas"
- Tarn, W.W. (1930), "Hellenistic Military and Naval Developments"
- Taylor, Michael J. (2011)."Disciplinary Measures: The Amphipolis Regulations." Ancient Warfare Magazine, IV.6
- Walbank, F.W. (1940), "Philip V of Macedon"
- Walbank, F.W. (1967), "A Historical Commentary on Polybius", Volume III
- Webber, Christopher (2001), "The Thracians 700 BC-AD 46"
