= Leukaspides =

Unit of the Antigonid Macedonian army

The Leukaspides (Greek: Λευκάσπιδες, lit. 'White Shields') were a group in the Antigonid Macedonian army. Scholars suggest two main possibilities for what precisely they were. The first is that they were equipped in the style of the Macedonian phalanx and were a counterpart to the Chalkaspides ("Bronze Shields"), a group uncontroversially known to be sarissa-wielding hoplites with bronze shields (the pelta and aspis). In this possibility, they were probably only mustered when the Macedonians needed more manpower as a supplemental corps. The second possibility is that the Leukaspides referred to ethnically non-Macedonian troops hired as auxiliaries or mercenaries who fought using thyreos shields, which were wooden, oval-shaped, and covered with hide or felt. Ancient sources refer to a "phalanx" of Leukaspides several times, but in the second possibility, it is assumed that the word "phalanx" is meant in the broad sense of any organized military troop, rather than the specific sense of Greek-style spear phalanxes. Auxiliaries (regardless of whether they were called "white shields" or not) probably fought using whatever their locally trained weaponry was—swords, slings, battle axes, and so on.

The Leukaspides are reported in ancient sources as troops used by King Antigonus Doson in his campaign against Cleomenes III of Sparta in the 220s BCE, and the white shields of the Leukaspides are mentioned as spoils of war after the Battle of Pydna in 168 BCE.

== Primary sources ==
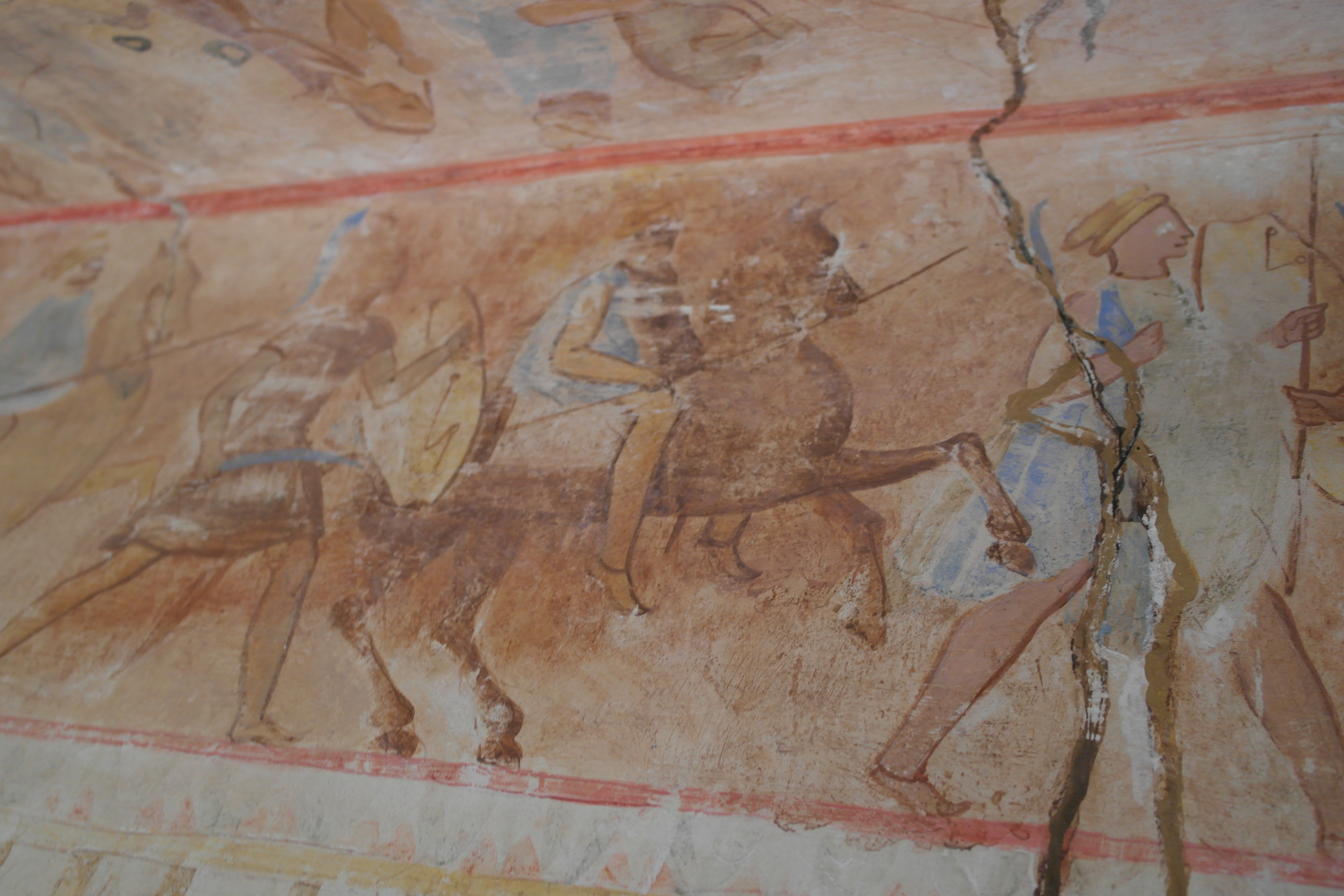
Fresco of Thracian warriors from the Thracian Tomb of Kazanlak. Some Thracian warriors probably used oval wooden thyreos shields covered with hides, rather than the bronze pelta or aspis of the chalkaspides ("Bronze Shields"). Nicholas Victor Sekunda argues that these and similar allies of the Antigonids were the "White Shields".

=== Asculum ===
The earliest chronological use of the term is not in an Antigonid context, but rather refers to troops allied to Pyrrhus of Epirus. According to Dionysius of Halicarnassus, some Tarentine mercenaries had white shields, and took part at the Battle of Asculum (279 BCE):

King Pyrrhus gave the Macedonian phalanx the first place on the right wing and placed next to it the Italiot mercenaries from Tarentum; then the troops from Ambracia and after them the phalanx of Tarentines equipped with white shields, followed by the allied force of Bruttians and Lucanians...

— Dionysius of Halicarnassus, Roman Antiquities, Book 20

=== Cleomenic War ===
The next notable ancient source discussing the manner is Plutarch's Parallel Lives, in his work on Cleomenes III, which mentions use of leukaspides during the Cleomenean War (229–222 BCE):

After Antigonus had taken Tegea by siege, and had surprised Orchomenus and Mantineia, Cleomenes, now reduced to the narrow confines of Laconia, set free those of the Helots who could pay down five Attic minas (thereby raising a sum of five hundred talents), armed two thousand of them in Macedonian fashion as an offset to the White Shields of Antigonus, and planned an undertaking which was great and entirely unexpected.

— Plutarch, The Life of Cleomenes, 23.1

Interestingly, the historian Polybius makes no mention of leukaspides in his account of the Cleomenic War, although he does extensively list the composition of the Antigonid army: 10,000 chalkaspides, 3,000 peltasts, 300 cavalry, 1,000 Agrianians, 1,000 Gauls, 3,000 mercenary infantry, and 300 mercenary cavalry. Polybius also lists allies of the Antigonids in the Achaean League and other allied Boeotians, Epeirots, Acarnanias, and Illyrians. Nicholas Victor Sekunda, who favors the historical stance that the leukaspides were non-Macedonian auxiliaries, argues that Plutarch's reference referred to the Greek states such as Sparta acknowledging the superiority of the Macedonian phalanx to their own systems, and believing that creating their own Macedonian-style phalanx would "offset" any non-phalanx auxiliary troops ("White Shields") with the superiority of the phalanx. Thus, to Sekunda, Plutarch meant the allied Achaeans, Boeotians, Acarnians, etc. with the reference to the "White Shields", not a separate section of the Macedonian regulars, since Polybius merely lists a single group of chalkaspides.

Regardless of what the "White Shields" referred to, them being a less prestigious supplement to the chalkaspides is implied by the parallelism between the leukaspides and armed helots. Helots were low-status slaves in Sparta, and arming them was probably presented to the Spartan elite as a measure done from the necessities of war by Cleomenes. Similarly, the leukaspides may have been less "trustworthy" troops in some fashion, whether marshaled from low-class citizenry or from non-Macedonians, and only mustered when necessary.

=== Pydna ===
The Battle of Pydna (168 BCE) was a crushing victory for the Romans over the Antigonids that brought about the end of the Third Macedonian War (171–168 BCE). Diodorus Siculus mentions white shields being part of the looted spoils of war at a triumph awarded in honor of Aemilius Paullus:

Subsequently Aemilius, after arranging splendid games and revelries for the assembled multitude, sent off to Rome whatever treasure had been discovered, and when he himself arrived, along with his fellow generals, he was ordered by the senate to enter the city in triumph. Anicius first, and Octavius, the commander of the fleet, celebrated each his triumph for a single day, but the very wise Aemilius celebrated his for three days. On the first day the procession opened with twelve hundred waggons filled with embossed white shields, then another twelve hundred filled with bronze shields, and three hundred more laden with lances, pikes, bows, and javelins; as in war, trumpeters led the way. There were many other waggons as well, carrying arms of various sorts, and eight hundred panoplies mounted on poles.

— Diodorus Siculus, The Library of History, 31.9-31.10

From this line, it sounds as if the Macedonians had roughly equal numbers of chalkaspides as leukaspides at Pydna, given that an equal number of bronze shields and white shields are recorded as loot.

The translator to English, Francis R. Walton, stuck a footnote on "embossed" that the Greek term really meant more like "rough", but thought that made no sense for shields made of bronze (even if painted white). Nicholas Victor Sekunda argues that "rough" was indeed the correct translation, and the white shields were hide-covered thyreos used by Thracians, which could indeed be rough. Plutarch writes that Thracians indeed used white shields at Pydna:

First the Thracians advanced, whose appearance, Nasica says, was most terrible, — men of lofty stature, clad in tunics which showed black beneath the white and gleaming armour of their shields and greaves, and tossing high on their right shoulders battle-axes with heavy iron heads.

— Plutarch, The Life of Aemilius, 18.5

== See also ==
- Argyraspides

== Bibliography ==
- Head, Duncan (1982). Armies of the Macedonian and Punic Wars. WRG.
- Bar-Kochva, Bezalel (1976). The Seleucid Army: Organization and Tactics in the Great Campaigns. Cambridge University Press. ISBN 9780521206679.
- Sekunda, Nicholas Victor (2012). Macedonian Armies after Alexander, 323-168 BC. Osprey.
- Sekunda, Nicholas Victor (2013). The Antigonid Army. Akanthina No. 8. Gdańsk: University of Gdańsk.
