= Battle of Callinicus =

171 BCE battle of the Third Macedonian War

Coordinates: 39.632098°N 22.419935°E

- Part of the Third Macedonian War
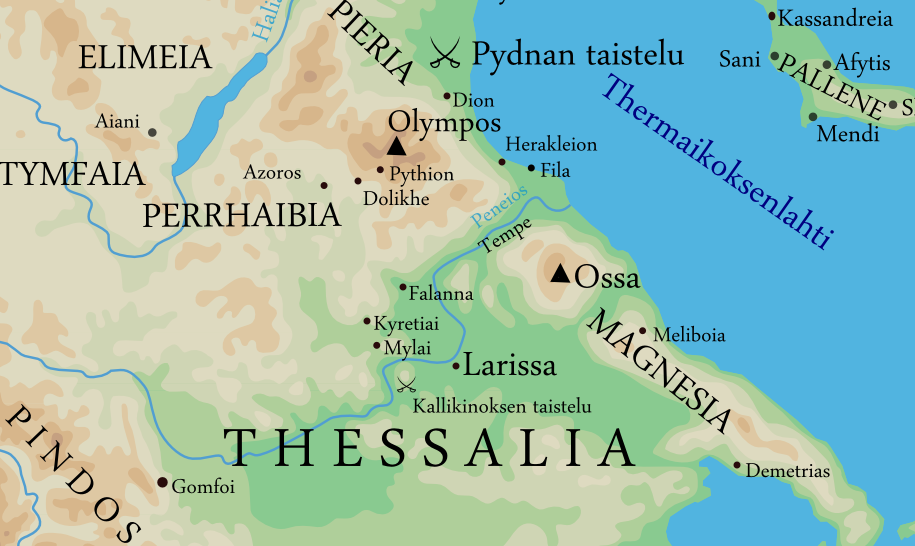
- Thessaly during Third Macedonian War
| Date | 171 BC |
| Location | By a hill called Callinicus near the Roman camp at Tripolis Larisaia, Thessaly |
| Result | Greek victory |

Belligerents
| Kingdom of Macedon: Odrysian kingdom | Roman Republic: Kingdom of Pergamon; Thessaly |

Commanders and leaders
| Perseus of Macedon; Cotys IV | Licinius Crassus; Eumenes II |

The Battle of Callinicus (Greek: μάχη του Καλλίνικου) was fought in 171 BC between Macedonia and the Roman Republic near a hill called Callinicus, close to the Roman camp at Tripolis Larisaia, five kilometres north of Larissa, the capital of Thessaly. It was fought during the first year of the Third Macedonian War (171-168 BC). The Macedonians were led by their king, Perseus of Macedon, while the Roman force was led by the consul Publius Licinius Crassus. The Macedonians were supported by Cotys IV, the king of the Odrysian kingdom (the largest state in Thrace) and his forces, Cretan mercenaries, and auxiliaries of mixed nationalities. The Romans had their Italian allies with them and were supported by soldiers provided by Eumenes II of Pergamon, as well as a force of Thessalian cavalry and Greek allies. The battle saw the deployment of troops with cavalry intermixed with light infantry. Although the battle was actually inconclusive because Perseus withdrew before it came to a conclusion, it was considered a Macedonian victory because the Romans suffered heavy casualties.

== Background ==
With the outbreak of war, Roman consul Publius Licinius sailed from Italy to Epirus on the west coast of Greece and marched across most of Greece through arduous mountain passes to reach Thessaly. Meanwhile, Perseus ravaged the northern districts of Thessaly, close to the Macedonian border. After he set up his camp, Perseus sent a detachment to ravage the fields of Pherae, in southern Thessaly, hoping to draw the Romans away from their camp. However, the Romans did not respond. Later Perseus was seen near the Roman camp with a detachment at 9 am. A Roman detachment was sent for reconnaissance. The two forces clashed in a drawn battle.

For the next several days Perseus showed up on the same spot and at the same hour. The Romans did not offer battle and each time he withdrew. As he had failed to draw Roman cavalry units of their camp, Perseus moved his camp and placed it five miles from the Roman camp. Then at dawn he marched to the Roman camp with all of his cavalry and light infantry. This caught the Romans by surprise because they were used to seeing him at a later time. Perseus lined up his men a mile and a half from the Roman line.

== Deployment ==
The deployment of the Roman and Macedonian forces was described by Livy, who said that the two armies were almost equally matched in cavalry numbers.

=== Macedon ===
Livy tells us that the main part of the Macedonian line consisted of mixed groups of cavalry and light infantry: Perseus' agema (a detachment of elite troops with both heavy and light infantry) and the "sacred" (elite) cavalry who held the centre with 400 slingers and javelin throwers in front of them. The whole of Cotys IV's Thracian cavalry and light infantry held the left wing while in the right wing there were the Macedonian cavalry and the Cretan infantry. The two wings were flanked by the King's cavalry and auxiliaries from various nationalities.

=== Rome ===
Similarly, the Romans had cavalry intermixed with light infantry on the wings, but no heavy infantry. Publius Licinius sent out only the cavalry and light infantry. The right wing had the Roman light infantry and the whole of the cavalry of the Italian allies. The left wing had the cavalry and the light infantry of the various allied Greek cities. The centre had a selected body of volunteer cavalry and 200 Gauls and 300 Crytians brought by Eumenes II in front of it. A Thessalian cavalry of 400 was arrayed at a short distance in front of the left wing. These forces were lined up in front of the rampart of the Roman camp.

Publius Licinius kept the heavy infantry lined up behind the rampart; that is, inside the Roman camp.

== The battle ==
The battle was started by the slingers and the javelin throwers. The Thracians then launched a furious charge against the Italian cavalry, which was thrown into disorder. Perseus charged with the centre, dislodged the Greek allies of Rome and pushed them back. The allied Thessalian cavalry, which had been kept in reserve, formed a junction with the troops of Eumenes II at the rear, keeping their ranks unbroken and affording a safe retreat for the disorderly flight of the Italian cavalry. The intensity of the Macedonian attack began to slacken off, and the Thessalians ventured forward to protect the fleeing Roman foot soldiers. Perseus's troops had become spread out in their pursuit of fugitives, and thus did not try to come close to the enemy which was advancing in compact formation. The Macedonian phalanx now advanced without having been ordered to do so by Perseus, and the Roman heavy infantry came out of the camp. On seeing it advancing, Euander, the commander of the Cretans, advised Perseus that continuing the battle was an unnecessary risk. The king decided to withdraw.

The Romans lost 200 cavalry and 2,000 infantry and 600 of them were captured. The Macedonians lost 20 cavalry and 40 infantry. Although the battle was actually inconclusive because of Perseus' decision to withdraw rather than bringing it to a conclusion, it was considered a Macedonian victory because of the heavy casualties of the Romans and the light ones of the Macedonians.

== Aftermath ==
Eumenes II urged the consul to move the camp of the other bank of the river to get the protection of that watercourse. The camp was moved that night. Perseus returned the next day for another battle, but when he saw that the Roman camp was safe on the other side of the river, he felt that he had been wrong not to continue the battle and to have remained inactive during the night. As a result, he had not been able to prevent the Romans crossing of the river and thus failed to wipe out the enemy. The Roman misfortune was blamed on the Aetolian contingent, which panicked, causing the flight of the whole of the Greek wing, which followed the example of the Aetolians. Five Aetolian officers who were said to have been the first to run away were sent to Rome. The Thessalians were rewarded for their bravery.

The battle did not make much of a difference to the course the first year of the war. The campaign came to a stalemate. Perseus offered peace terms, but Publius Licinius rejected the offer. The consul's focus seemed to be on harvesting local crops to feed his troops. He moved from the north of Larissa to its south-east (to Crannon, modern Krannonas) for this purpose. Then he moved northwards, toward Macedon and harvested again. Perseus carried out some attacks, but these did not amount to more than skirmishes. When he lost one of these skirmishes he left northern Thessaly and returned to Macedon. As winter was approaching he sent his troops to winter camps. After Perseus left, Publius Licinius tried to take a town in the Vale of Tempe, a gorge between Thessaly and Macedon which was the passage between the two states. However, he gave up because it was well fortified. He seized a few towns in the area and returned to his camp.

The Thessalians established a bull-fighting competition called the Stenaia in commemoration of the battle, which was still being celebrated in the Roman Imperial period.
