= Battle of Andros (246 BC) =

Naval battle during the Third Syrian War

- Part of Third Syrian War
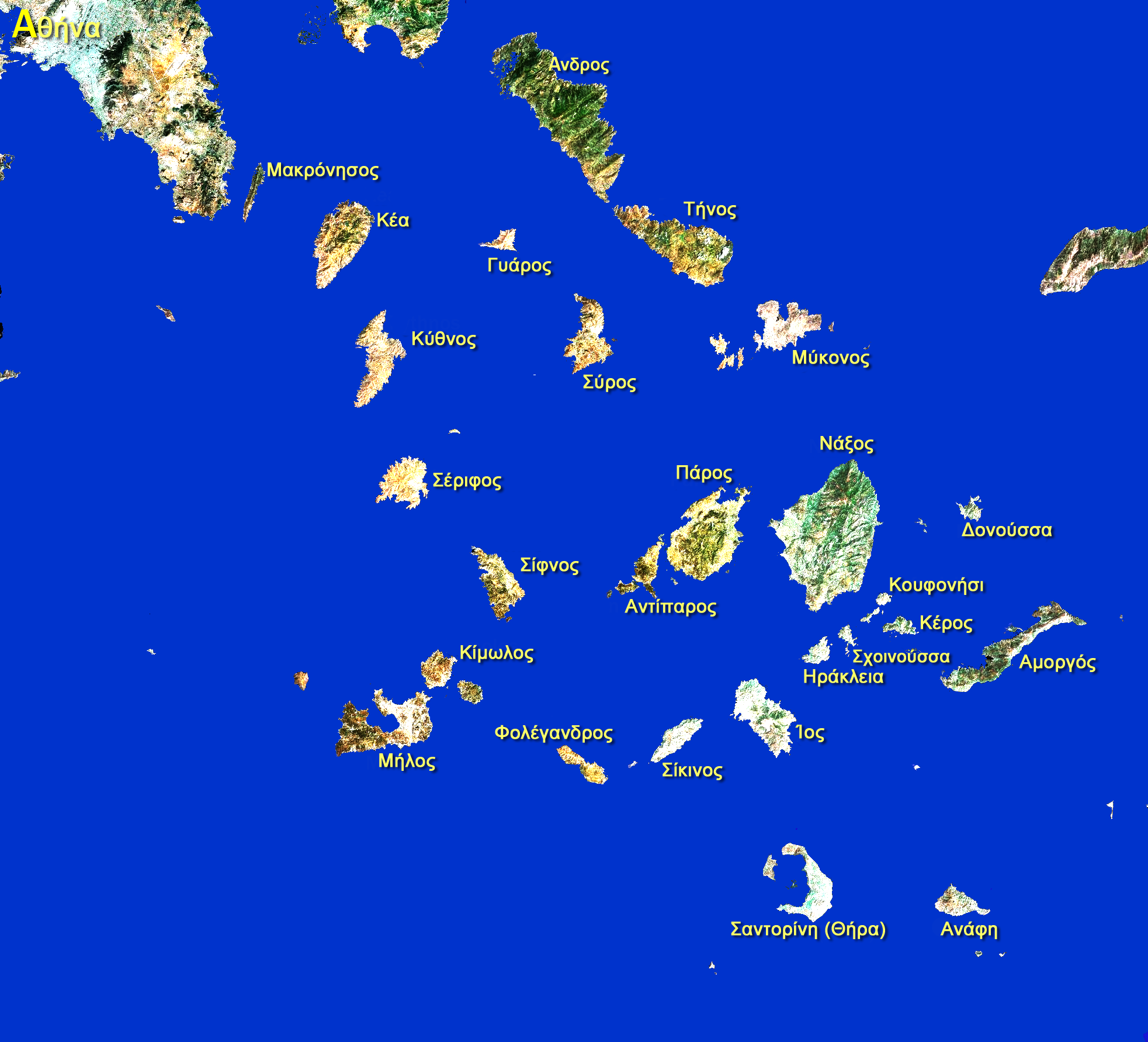
- Map of Cyclades, Greece
Date	246/245 BC
Location	Andros
Result	Antigonid victory

Belligerents
Antigonid Macedon	Ptolemaic Kingdom

Commanders and leaders
Antigonus II Gonatas	Sophron of Ephesus; Ptolemy Andromachou

Strength
Numerically inferior	Numerically superior

The Battle of Andros was an obscure naval battle during the Third Syrian War. Despite its numerical superiority, the Egyptian fleet, probably commanded by Sophron of Ephesus, lost to a Macedonian fleet led by Antigonus II Gonatas. The Egyptian captain Ptolemy Andromachou, an illegitimate half-brother of the Pharaoh, lost his ship and crew, barely escaping to Ephesus.

The date of the battle is uncertain, but generally the year 246/245 BC is accepted. Following the battle, the Egyptian king Ptolemy III Euergetes lost the dominion of the Nesiotic League to Antigonus Gonatas.

== See also ==
- Ptolemaic Egypt
- Seleucid Empire
- Syrian Wars
