= Nicholas Sekunda =

Archaeologist and historian (born 1953)

Nicholas Victor Sekunda (born 5 November 1953) is an archaeologist and historian. He is currently the Head of the Department of Mediterranean Archaeology at the University of Gdańsk. His areas of research include war in antiquity, the Achaemenid Empire (First Persian Empire), the Hellenistic era after the conquests of Alexander the Great, the Hellenistic armies of the Greek successor states (diadochi), and the History of Crete.

== Biography ==
Sekunda was born in 1953 in Mansfield, Nottinghamshire, United Kingdom; his father was Polish. He studied ancient history and archeology at the University of Manchester for his education, earning a BA in 1975. Staying in Manchester, he earned his PhD in 1981, with his thesis on Cretan archers. Sekunda published journal articles in the 1980s and 90s, although also worked in industry. He returned to academia in 1997 to work at the Institute of Archeology and Ethnology of the Polish Academy of Sciences in Warsaw. His habilitation in 2002 was also with the Institute of Archeology; his resulting work was published in book form as Hellenistic Infantry Reforms of the 160's BC. He later gained a position as an assistant professor at Gdańsk University, and became a full professor in 2015.

Sekunda has participated in various archaeological excavations in England, Poland, Iran, Greece, Syria and Jordan. He was a codirector of excavations, with Goran Sanev of the Archaeological Museum of Skopje, at Negotino Gradište in North Macedonia, a joint Polish-Macedonian project that began in 2009.

A Festschrift was published in 2023 for his 70th birthday, Καθηγητής: Studies in Ancient History, Warfare and Art Presented to Nick Sekunda on his Seventieth Birthday, featuring various essays and articles.

== Selected works ==
Sekunda's books aimed at a scholarly audience include:

- Sekunda, Nicholas (1994). Seleucid and Ptolemaic Reformed Armies 168-145 BC, Volume 1: The Seleucid Army. Angus McBride (illustrator). Montvert Publications.
- Sekunda, Nicholas (1995). Seleucid and Ptolemaic Reformed Armies 168-145 BC, Volume 2: The Ptolemaic Army. Angus McBride (illustrator). Montvert Publications.
- Sekunda, Nicholas Victor (2001). Hellenistic Infantry Reform in the 160's BC. Studies on the History of Ancient and Medieval Art of Warfare 5. Oficyna Naukowa MS. ISBN 83-85874-04-6.
- Sekunda, Nicholas Victor (2013). The Antigonid Army. Akanthina No. 8. Gdańsk: University of Gdańsk. ISBN 978-83-7531-266-9.

Sekunda has also written many books intended for a popular audience, mostly with Osprey Publishing, a publisher of military history books.

- Sekunda, Nicholas (1984). The Army of Alexander the Great. Men-at-Arms 148. Angus McBride (illustrator). Osprey Publishing. ISBN 9780850455397.
- Sekunda, Nicholas (2005) [1986]. The Ancient Greeks. Elite 7. Angus McBride (illustrator). Osprey.
- Sekunda, Nicholas (1992). The Persian Army 560-330 BC. Elite 42. Simon Chew (illustrator). London: Osprey. ISBN 978-1-85532-250-9.
- Sekunda, Nicholas; Northwood, Simon (1995). Early Roman Armies. Men-at-Arms 283. Richard Hook (illustrator). Osprey Publishing. ISBN 1-85532-513-6.
- Sekunda, Nicholas (1996). Republican Roman Army 200-104 BC. Men-at-Arms 291. Angus McBride (illustrator). Osprey Publishing. ISBN 1-85532-598-5.
- Sekunda, Nicholas (1998). The Spartan Army. Elite 60. Richard Hook (illustrator). Osprey Publications. ISBN 1-85532-659-0.
- Sekunda, Nicholas (2000). Greek Hoplite, 480-330 BC. Warrior 27. Adam Hook (illustrator). Osprey Publishing. ISBN 1-85532-867-4.
- Sekunda, Nicholas (2002). Marathon 490 BC: The First Persian Invasion of Greece. Campaign 108. Richard Hook (illustrator). Osprey Publishing. ISBN 978-0-27-598836-4.
- Sekunda, Nicholas (2012). Macedonian Armies After Alexander, 323-168 BC. Men-at-Arms 477. Peter Dennis (illustrator). Osprey Publishing.
- Sekunda, Nicholas (2019). The Army of Pyrrhus of Epirus: 3rd century BC. Men-at-Arms 528. Peter Dennis (illustrator). Osprey Publishing.

He has also edited a variety of volumes of festschrifts, monograph collections, and conference proceedings.

- Sekunda, Nicholas, ed. (2007). Corolla Cosmo Rodewald. Akanthina No. 2. University of Gdańsk.
- Sekunda, Nicholas, ed. (2010). Ergasteria: Works Presented to John Ellis Jones on His 80th Birthday. University of Gdańsk.
- Sekunda, Nicholas; Borel, Alejandro Noguera, eds. (2011). Hellenistic Warfare 1. Monografias del Instituto Valenciano de Estudios Clásicos y Orientales 2. Fundación Libertas 7, Instituto Valenciano de Estudios Clásicos y Orientales.
- Sekunda, Nicholas; Burliga, Bogdan, eds. (2014). Iphicrates, Peltasts and Lechaeum. Akanthina No. 9. University of Gdańsk.
- Sekunda, Nicholas; Rance, Philip, eds. (2017). Greek Taktika: Ancient Military Writing and its Heritage. University of Gdańsk.
- Sekunda, Nicholas, ed. (2020). Wonders Lost and Found: A Celebration of the Archaeological Work of Professor Michael Vickers. Archaeopress Publishing. ISBN 978-0-8061-3000-2.
