= Aspis =

Shield used by Ancient Greek hoplites

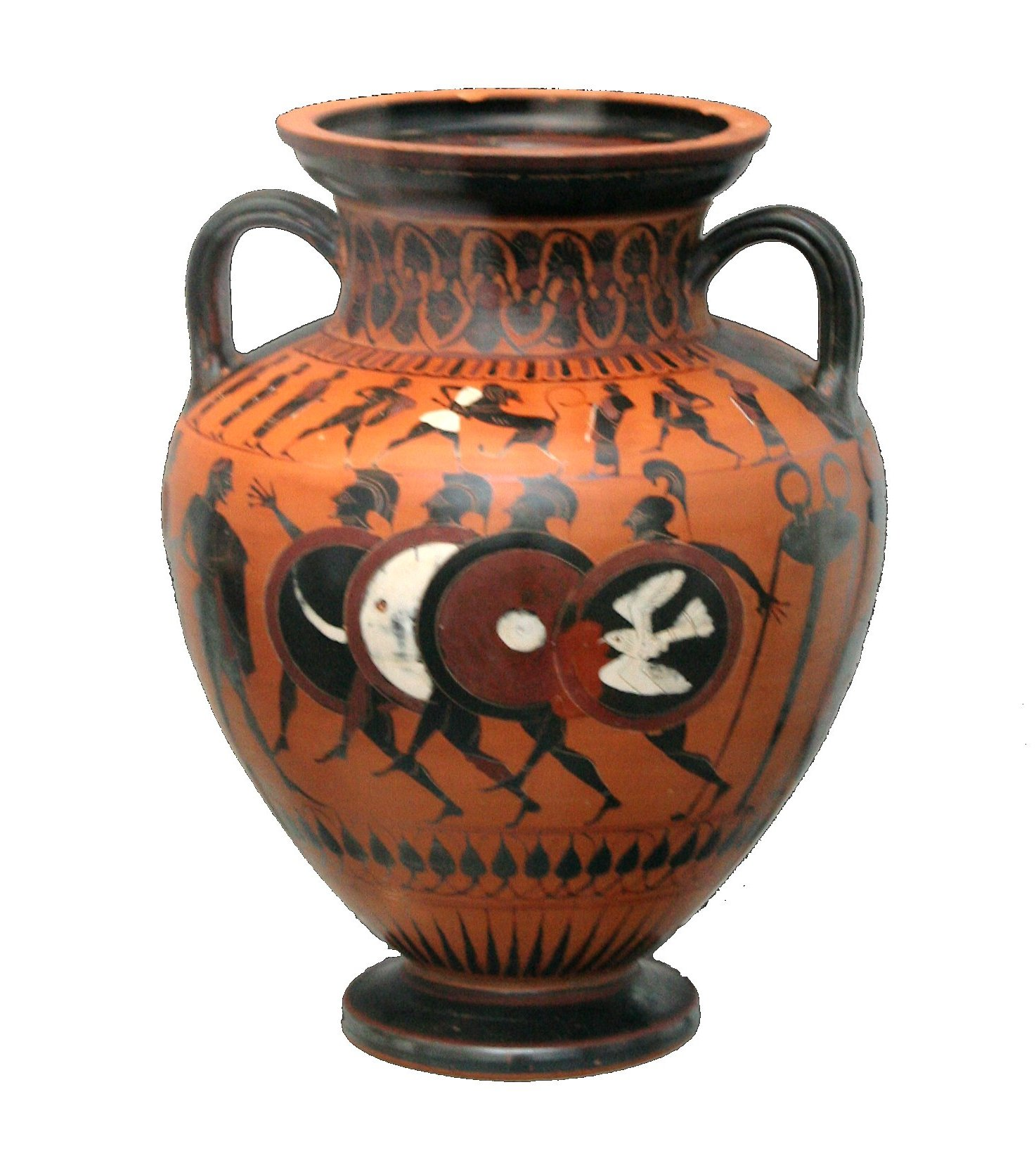
Hoplitodromos with aspis and full body armour depicted in a Greek vase dated to 550 BC.

An aspis (Ancient Greek: ἀσπίς; pl.: aspides, ἀσπίδες) or porpax shield was the heavy wooden shield used by the infantry in various periods of ancient Greece, introduced in the late eighth or early seventh centuries BC.

== Construction ==
An aspis was deeply dished and made primarily of wood. Some had a thin sheet of bronze on the outer face, often just around the rim. The convention was to decorate the shield.

The aspis often exceeded 0.9 metres (3 ft) in diameter, typically weighed about 7 kilograms (16 lb), and was about 2 1/2–4 centimetres (1–1 1/2 in) thick. This large shield was made possible partly by its shape, which allowed it to be supported comfortably on the shoulder. The revolutionary part of the shield was, in fact, the grip. Known as an argive grip, it placed the handle at the edge of the shield and was supported by a leather or bronze fastening for the forearm at the center, known as the porpax. This allowed hoplites more mobility with the shield, as well as the ability to capitalize on their offensive capabilities and better support the phalanx. The shield rested on a man's shoulders, stretching down to the knees; and it had a convex face, like that of a shallow bowl. It was theorized they were designed for a mass of hoplites to push forward into the opposing army, a move called othismos. The convex face would allow the bearers to continue breathing (and therefor pushing) while being crushed from ahead and behind. An enemy soldier without this innovation would suffocate, then faint or panic; though this is a disputed theory.

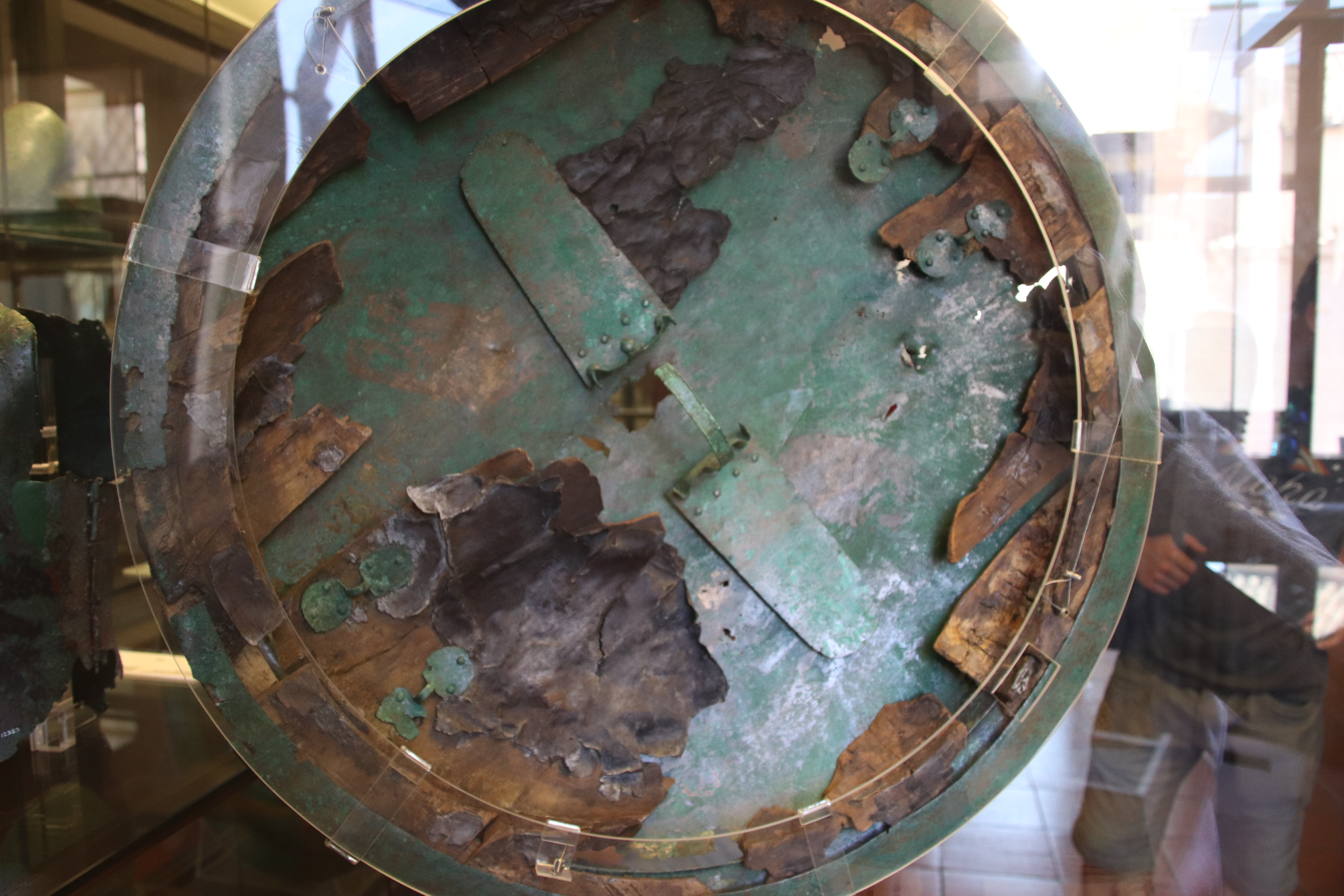
The "Bomarzo" or "Vatican" shield

Such shields did not tend to survive the passage of time very well, and only one aspis has survived into modernity with sufficient preservation to allow us to determine the details of its construction: this shield is called the "Bomarzo" or "Vatican" shield, and it is currently located in the Vatican, within the Museo Gregoriano Etrusco. It was discovered in 1830 near Bomarzo in Lazio, central Italy.

== See also ==
- Ancient Greek warfare
- Clipeus – a similar shield used by the Romans
- Peltast – a light infantryman using a lighter pelte shield
- Thyreophoroi and thorakitai – medium infantrymen using thyreos shields
