= Who Killed Homer? =

1998 book by Victor Davis Hanson and John Heath

- Author: Victor Davis Hanson, John Heath
- Language: English
- Publisher: Free Press
- Publication date: April 7, 1998
- Pages: 290 (first ed.)
- ISBN: 0684844532
- Dewey Decimal: 480.7073
- LC Class: PA78.U6 H36 1998

Who Killed Homer?: The Demise of Classical Education and the Recovery of Greek Wisdom, is a 1998 book by Classics scholars Victor Davis Hanson and John Heath.

Reviewing Who Killed Homer? for Foreign Affairs, Francis Fukuyama described it as "ostensibly" focused on the decline of classical studies, but "really about the loss of a common, humanistic core in contemporary education and culture."

Camille Paglia, writing in The Washington Post, called Who Killed Homer? "the most substantive by far of the academic critiques that have appeared in the past 15 years. This passionate protest, with its wealth of facts and its flights of savage indignation, is a must read for anyone interested in the future of higher education in the United States."
