= The Other Greeks =

1995 book by Victor Davis Hanson

The Other Greeks: The Family Farm and the Agrarian Roots of Western Civilization
- Cover of the first edition
- Author: Victor Davis Hanson
- Language: English
- Subject: Archaic Greece
- Publisher: University of California Press
- Publication date: 1995
- Publication place: United States
- Pages: 596
- ISBN: 978-0520209350

The Other Greeks: The Family Farm and the Agrarian Roots of Western Civilization is a 1995 book by Victor Davis Hanson, in which the author describes the underlying agriculturally centered laws, warfare, and family life of the Greek Archaic or polis period. Hanson's central argument is that the Greeks who farmed the countrysides of the Greek Archaic period ("the Other Greeks") are responsible for the rise of representative governments, promotion of the middle class, amateur militias composed of citizens, and other values of Western Culture, not the widely written about Greek intelligentsia. Hanson aims to connect the rises and falls of varying governments to the degree to which homesteading is a widespread practice among the populace.

== Summary ==
Hanson argues that the Archaic Greek city-state or polis was an institution that grew out of the intensive farming of Greek countryside at the end of Greek Dark Ages. During Archaic Greece, the Greek yeomen had roughly the same amount of land, the same interests, and the same purchasing power. It is this group of free farmers who work their own land in mass that create the constitutional governments of the poleis (city-states). These poleis then primarily functioned to foster the practice of intensive farming by the voting class. At the end of the Archaic period and the beginning of Classical times, the veneration of individuality and equality had destroyed the very system of government it created. The book is divided into three sections: 1 - The Rise of the Small Farmer in Ancient Greece, 2 - The Preservation of Agrarianism, and 3 - To Lose a Culture.

=== Part One ===
Part one discusses post- Mycenean Greece (1100 BC). Hanson argues that after the fall of Mycenean Greece, that Greece was decentralized, and people in an effort to feed themselves, turned to homesteading. Documents from the time show that the size of the Greek yeoman farm was roughly equal. This rough equality in farm size translated to a rough equality in material wealth and created a citizenry neither poor nor wealthy but situated in the middle of their society. Additionally, the daily struggle of the small farmer against nature created a shared sense of comradery among the yeomen due to the similarity of their experiences.

=== Part Two ===
Part two of the book discusses the development of the polis. Hanson suggests that the common culture of farming shared by the "Other Greeks" led them to create a government that protected their interests. In the Greek polis, landed yeomen were typically the only citizens who could vote. As such, these "middling farmers" determined the laws of the polis in times of peace and decided when the polis would wage war. Hanson uses evidence of short warfare duration and the fact that wars typically occurred in the agricultural downtime of August to suggest that the hoplites were Greek yeomen farmers.

=== Part Three ===
Part three scrutinizes the decline of the egalitarian polis culture which occurred around 500 - 300 BC and is associated with Classical Greece. Hanson argues that an increase in wealth disparity drove the destruction of the egalitarian "polis" in Greece. Wealth disparity manifested itself in unequal plots of land and differential taxation. Marginal lands, i.e. many of the lands that Greek homesteads were located on, could not produce enough food to be viable in subsistence agricultural practice under the heavy taxes of the Classical period. This forced many yeomen off of their farms and potentially into serfdom. This precipitated the destruction of a form of government in which the voter also is a legislative representative, warrior, and farmer.

== Publication history ==
The book was first published in 1995 by the University of California Press. A second edition updated with a preface and a recent bibliography of the works of Victor Davis Hanson was published in 1999.

== Reception and influence ==
The Other Greeks has been called a masterpiece as well as a foundation for understanding the polis. While reviewers do discuss shortcomings such as failing to discuss the effect of slavery on polis culture, or an overstatement of the case that agrarianism was the only common thread in Archaic Greece, reviews are generally positive.
