= Thorakitai =

Hellenistic soldiers equipped with mail

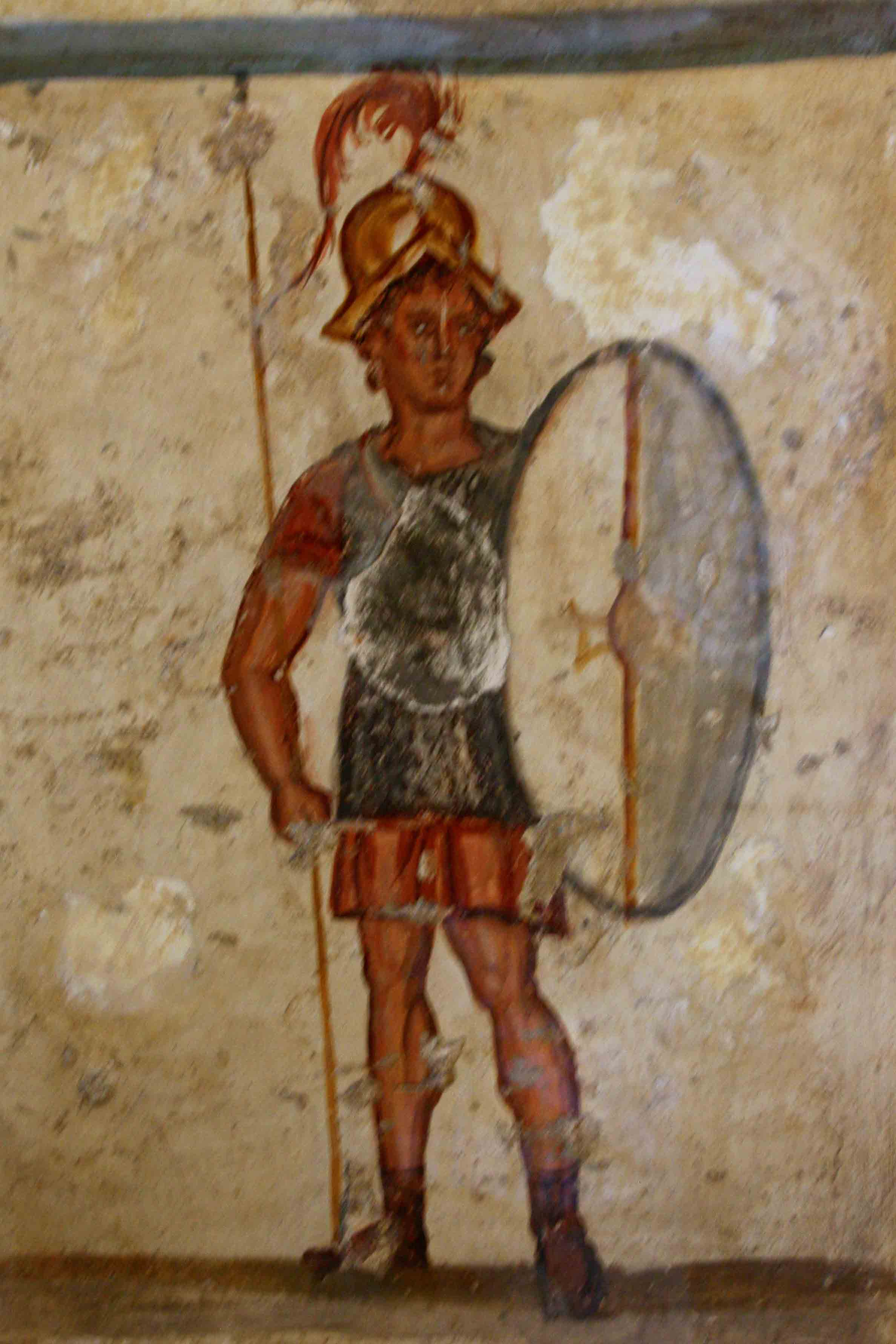
Fresco of an ancient Macedonian soldier (thorakitai) wearing chainmail armor and bearing a thureos shield

The thorakitai (Greek: θωρακίται; sg.: θωρακίτης, thorakites) were a type of soldier in Hellenistic armies similar to the thureophoroi. The literal translation of the term is "cuirassiers", which suggests that they may have worn a short Celtic mail shirt or possibly a linothorax.

== Role ==
Thorakitai were used in armies of the Hellenistic period in a variety of tactical situations. They were a type of armoured but mobile infantry who did not require a rigid formation to be effective in combat. From their name we can deduce that most wore armor and helmet. They bore a thureos, an oval shield, and were armed with sword, javelins and spear, which were used according to their tactical use. It seems that the thorakitai were heavily armored thureophoroi, able to bear spears and do battle in a phalanx as well as engage in irregular warfare in situations when such an action was required for tactical reasons, like to exploit or challenge rough terrain.

One view is that the thorakites were a final step in the development of the peltasts. Alternative views state that they were hoplites with cheaper equipment. Roman authors may have seen them as imitation legionaries.

== History ==
The thorakitai are mentioned in the army of the Achaean League and in the Seleucid army. The Seleucid thorakitai were used in the storming of the Elburz Range in 210 BC under Antiochus III. They were used with the lighter troops to climb the cliffs and fight hand to hand with the enemy who might have not been dislodged by the lighter troops in the assault. There is a tomb illustration from Sidon showing what could well be a thorakites. The fragmentary inscription indicates that he was an Anatolian.

== Sources ==
- Head, Duncan (1982). Armies of the Macedonian and Punic Wars. WRG.
- Bar-Kochva, Brzalel (1979). The Seleucid Army: Organization and Tactics in the great campaigns. Cambridge University Press.
- Walbank, F.W. (1967). A Historical Commentary on Polybius, Volume III. Oxford University Press.
- Webber, Chris (12 July 2011). The Gods of Battle: The Thracians at War, 1500 BC - 150 AD. Pen & Sword Books. ISBN 978-1-84884-942-6.
