= Victor Davis Hanson =

American Professor (born 1953)

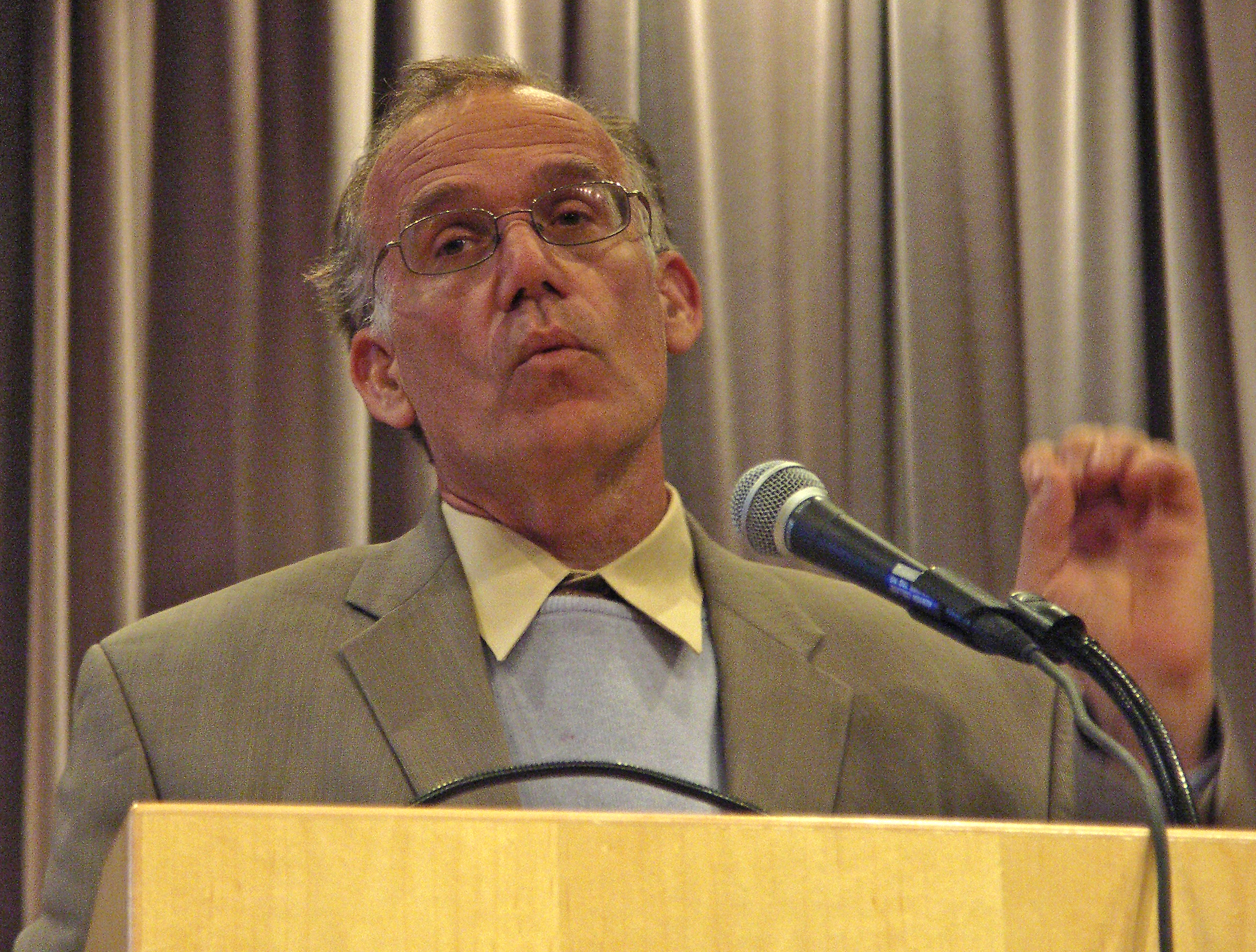
- Born: September 5, 1953 (age 73); Fowler, California, U.S.
- Education: University of California (BA); Yale University; Stanford University (PhD)
- Occupations: Professor, Classicist, Historian, Political Commentator
- Spouse: Cara Webb (m. 1977; div. 2005) Jennifer Heyne (m. 2013)
- Children: 3
- Writing career
- Subjects: Military History - Ancient Warfare - Ancient Athens - Roman Empire - Byzantine Empire - Ancient Philosophy
- Notable awards: National Humanities Medal (2007)

Victor Davis Hanson (born September 5, 1953) is an American classicist, military historian, conservative political commentator, and farmer. He is a commentator on modern and ancient warfare and contemporary politics for the New York Times, the Wall Street Journal, the National Review and the Washington Times.

He is a professor emeritus of classics at California State University, Fresno, the Martin and Illie Anderson Senior Fellow in classics and military history at the Hoover Institution, and visiting professor at Hillsdale College. Hanson was awarded the National Humanities Medal in 2007 by President George W. Bush and was a presidential appointee in 2007–2008 on the American Battle Monuments Commission.

== Early life and education ==
Hanson grew up in Selma, California, in the San Joaquin Valley, and has worked there most of his life.

He is of Swedish and Welsh ancestry, and his father's cousin, after whom he was named, was killed in the Battle of Okinawa.

Hanson received a B.A. in classics and general Cowell College honors from the University of California, Santa Cruz in 1975, and his PhD in classics from Stanford University in 1980.

== Academic career ==
Hanson noted autobiographically that he was "a full-time orchard and vineyard grower from 1980-1984, before joining the nearby CSU" (California State University, Fresno) in 1984, to launch a classical studies program there. In 1991, Hanson was awarded the American Philological Association's Excellence in Teaching Award, given annually to the nation's top undergraduate teachers of Greek and Latin. He was named distinguished alumnus of the year for 2006 at University of California, Santa Cruz. He has been a visiting professor of classics at Stanford University in California (1991–1992) and a National Endowment for the Humanities fellow at the Center for Advanced Studies in the Behavioral Sciences, Stanford, California (1992–1993). He was named a Alexander Onassis Fellow (2001), and was awarded the Chester W. Nimitz memorial lectureship in Military History at University of California, Berkeley (2006), and held the visiting Shifrin Chair of Military History at the U.S. Naval Academy, Annapolis, Maryland (2002–2003).

In 2004, he took early retirement from Cal State Fresno to focus on his political writing and popular history. Hanson has held a series of positions in conservative-leaning institutions and private foundations. He was appointed Fellow in California Studies at the Claremont Institute in 2002.

Hanson was appointed a Senior Fellow at the Hoover Institution, Stanford, California, a public policy think-tank where he is currently the chairman and principal investigator of the Working Group on the Role of Military History in Contemporary Conflict. He served as a William Simon Visiting Professor at the School of Public Policy at Pepperdine University, a private Christian institution in California, from 2009–2015, and was awarded in 2015 an Honorary Doctorate of Laws from the law school at Pepperdine. He gave the Wriston Lecture in 2004 for the Manhattan Institute an organization "dedicated to advancing opportunity, individual liberty, and the rule of law in America in its great cities." He became a board member of the Bradley Foundation in 2015 and served on the Harry Frank Guggenheim Foundation board for over a decade.

== Writing ==
Since 2004, Hanson has written a weekly column syndicated by Tribune Content Agency. He also wrote a weekly column for National Review Online from 2001 to 2021. He was awarded the National Humanities Medal (2007) by President George W. Bush, as well as the Eric Breindel Award for Excellence in Opinion Journalism (2002), and the Bradley Prize from the Lynde and Harry Bradley Foundation in 2008.

Hanson's Warfare and Agriculture (Giardini 1983), his PhD thesis, argued that Greek warfare could not be understood apart from agrarian life in general and suggested that the modern assumption that agriculture was irrevocably harmed during classical wars was vastly overestimated. Yale University lecturer Donald Kagan stated that "Hanson's work on the role of the small family farmer in the development of democracy is the most important work in Greek history in my lifetime," and that "its significance is hard to exaggerate."

The Western Way of War (Alfred Knopf 1989) explored the combatants' experiences of ancient Greek battle and detailed the Hellenic foundations of later Western military practice. In it Hansen argues that the ancient Greek poleis created a tradition of citizen soldiers that continues to make Europeans (and countries settled by Europeans) "the most deadly soldiers in the history of civilization."

The Other Greeks (The Free Press, 1995) argued that the emergence of a unique middling agrarian class explains the ascendance of the Greek city-state and its singular values of consensual government, sanctity of private property, civic militarism, and individualism. In Fields Without Dreams (The Free Press 1996, winner of the Bay Area Book Reviewers Award) and The Land Was Everything (The Free Press 2000, a Los Angeles Times notable book of the year), Hanson lamented the decline of family farming and rural communities and the loss of agrarian voices in American democracy. The Soul of Battle (The Free Press, 1999) traced the careers of Epaminondas, the Theban liberator, William Tecumseh Sherman, and George S. Patton in arguing that democratic warfare's strengths are best illustrated in short, intense, and spirited marches to promote consensual rule but bog down otherwise during long occupations or more conventional static battle.

In Mexifornia (Encounter 2003), a personal memoir about growing up in rural California and an account of immigration from Mexico, Hanson predicted that illegal immigration would soon reach crisis proportions unless legal, measured, and diverse immigration was restored, as well as the traditional melting-pot values of integration, assimilation, and intermarriage.

Ripples of Battle (Doubleday 2003) chronicled how the cauldron of battle affects combatants' later literary and artistic work, as its larger influence ripples for generations, affecting art, literature, culture, and government. In A War Like No Other (Random House 2005, a New York Times notable book of the year), a history of the Peloponnesian War, Hanson offered an alternative history, arranged by methods of fighting (triremes, hoplites, cavalry, sieges, etc.) in concluding that the conflict marked a brutal watershed event for the Greek city-states. The Savior Generals (Bloomsbury 2013) followed the careers of five great generals (Themistocles, Belisarius, Sherman, Ridgway, Petraeus) and argued that rare qualities in leadership emerge during hopeless predicaments that only rare individuals can salvage.

The End of Sparta (Bloomsbury 2011) is a novel about a small community of Thespian farmers who join the great march of Epaminondas (369/370 BC) to the heart of the Peloponnese to destroy Spartan hegemony, free the Messenian helots, and spread democracy in the Peloponnese.

Hanson has edited several collections of essays, including Hoplites (1991), Bonfire of the Humanities (with Bruce Thornton and John Heath, 2001), and Makers of Ancient Strategy (2010), as well as collections of his own articles, including An Autumn of War (2002), Between War and Peace (2004), and The Father of Us All (2010). He has written chapters of the Cambridge History of War, and the Cambridge History of Ancient Warfare.

=== Carnage and Culture ===
External videos
- Presentation by Hanson on Carnage and Culture, September 15, 2001, C-SPAN

In Hanson's book Carnage and Culture (Doubleday, 2001), published in Great Britain and the Commonwealth countries as Why the West Has Won, he argued that the military dominance of Western civilization, beginning with the ancient Greeks, results from certain fundamental aspects of Western culture, such as consensual government, a tradition of self-critique, secular rationalism, religious tolerance, individual freedom, free expression, free markets, and individualism. Hanson's emphasis on cultural exception rejects racial explanations for Western military pre-eminence and disagrees with the environmental or geographical determinist explanations such as those put forth by Jared Diamond in Guns, Germs, and Steel (1997).

In a 2007 article on the Media Matters for America website, the American military officer Robert L. Bateman criticized Hanson's thesis and argued that Hanson's point about Western armies preferring to seek out a decisive battle of annihilation is rebutted by the Second Punic War, in which Roman attempts to annihilate the Carthaginians instead led to the Carthaginians annihilating the Romans at the Battle of Cannae. Bateman argued that Hanson was wrong about Western armies' common preferences in seeking out a battle of annihilation and argued that the Romans defeated the Carthaginians only via the Fabian strategy of keeping their armies in being and not engaging Hannibal in battle. In a response published on his personal website, Hanson argued that Bateman had misunderstood and misrepresented his thesis. Hanson stated that in the Second Punic War, the Romans initially sought out decisive battles but were reluctantly forced to resort to a Fabian strategy after several defeats at the hands of a tactical genius until they had rebuilt their military capacity, when they ultimately defeated Hannibal in decisive battles. He also said that since the Carthaginians themselves had adopted many "Western" methods of warfare from the Greeks, Hannibal, too, was keen to seek decisive battles.

=== United States education and classical studies ===
Hanson co-authored the book Who Killed Homer? The Demise of Classical Education and the Recovery of Greek Wisdom with John Heath in 1998. The book explores the issue of how classical education has declined in the US and what might be done to restore it to its former prominence. That is important, according to Hanson and Heath, because knowledge of classical Greece and Rome is necessary for a full understanding of Western culture. To begin a discussion along those lines, the authors state, "The answer to why the world is becoming Westernized goes all the way back to the wisdom of the Greeks—reason enough why we must not abandon the study of our heritage."

The political scientist Francis Fukuyama reviewed Who Killed Homer? favorably in Foreign Affairs and wrote that, "The great thinkers of the Western tradition—from Hobbes, Burke, and Hegel to Weber and Nietzsche (who was trained as a classical philologist)—were so thoroughly steeped in Greek thought that they scarcely needed to refer back to original texts for quotations. This tradition has come under fire from two camps, one postmodernist that seeks to deconstruct the classics on the grounds of gender, race, and class, and the other pragmatic and career-minded that asks what value the classics have in a computer-driven society. The authors' defense of a traditionalist approach to the classics is worthy."

The classicists Victoria Cech and Joy Connolly found Who Killed Homer? to have considerable pitfalls. Reviews of the book have noted several problems with the authors' perception of classical culture. According to Cech, "One example is the relation of the individual to the state and the 'freedom' of belief or of inquiry in each. Socrates and Jesus were put to death by their respective states for articulating inconvenient doctrines. In Sparta, where the population of citizens (male) were carefully socialized in a military system, no one seems to have differed from the majority enough to merit the death penalty. But these differences are not sorted out by the authors, for their mission is to build an ideal structure of classical attitudes by which to reveal our comparative flaws, and their point is more what is wrong with us than what was right with Athens. I contend that Hanson and Heath are actually comparing modern academia not to the ancient seminal cultures but to the myth that arose about them over the last couple of millennia." According to Connolly, Professor of Classics at New York University as of 2016, "Throughout history, the authors say, women have never enjoyed equal rights and responsibilities. At least in Greece, 'the veiled, mutilated, and secluded were not the norm' (p. 57). Why waste time, then, as feminist scholarship does, 'merely demarcating the exact nature of the sexism of the Greeks and the West' (p. 102)? From their point of view, in fact, the real legacy of feminism is the destruction of the values of family and community."

== Political views ==
Hanson was at one time a registered member of the Democratic Party but was a conservative who voted for George W. Bush in the 2000 and 2004 elections. As of 2020, he was a registered independent. He defended George W. Bush and his policies, especially the Iraq War. He vocally supported Bush's Secretary of Defense Donald Rumsfeld, describing him as "a rare sort of secretary of the caliber of George Marshall" and a "proud and honest-speaking visionary" whose "hard work and insight are bringing us ever closer to victory."

External videos
- After Words interview with Hanson on The Case for Trump, March 23, 2019, C-SPAN

Hanson, a supporter of Donald Trump, wrote a 2019 book called The Case for Trump. Trump praised the book, in which Hanson defends Trump's insults and incendiary language as "uncouth authenticity", and praises Trump for "an uncanny ability to troll and create hysteria among his media and political critics."

He has been described as a neoconservative by some commentators for his views on the Iraq War and stated, "I came to support neocon approaches first in the wars against the Taliban and Saddam, largely because I saw little alternative." Hanson's 2002 An Autumn of War called for going to war "hard, long, without guilt, apology or respite until our enemies are no more." In the context of the Iraq War, Hanson wrote, "In an era of the greatest affluence and security in the history of civilization, the real question before us remains whether the United States – indeed any Western democracy – still possesses the moral clarity to identify evil as evil, and then the uncontested will to marshal every available resource to fight and eradicate it."

=== Race relations ===
In July 2013, Attorney General Eric Holder gave a speech at a meeting of the NAACP during which he said he "had to have a conversation with his son about how as a young black man he should interact with the police, what to say, and how to conduct himself if he was ever stopped or confronted" in an unwarranted way. In response to Holder's speech, Hanson wrote a column, "Facing Facts about Race," in which he offered his own version of "the Talk," the need to inform his children to be careful of young black men when venturing into the inner city, who Hanson argued were statistically more likely to commit violent crimes than young men of other races, and so it was understandable for the police to focus on them.

Arthur Stern described "Facing Facts About Race" as an "inflammatory" column based upon crime statistics that Hanson failed to cite: "His presentation of this controversial opinion as undeniable fact without exhaustive statistical proof is undeniably racist." Journalist Kelefa Sanneh observed that "It's strange, then, to read Hanson writing as if the fear of violent crime were mainly a "white or Asian" problem, about which African-Americans might be uninformed, or unconcerned – as if African-American parents weren't already giving their children more detailed and nuanced versions of Hanson's 'sermon', sharing his earnest and absurd hope that the right words might keep trouble at bay." In response to Sanneh, Hanson accused him of a "McCarthyite character assassination" and "infantile, if not racialist, logic."

=== Obama criticism ===
Hanson was a critic of President Barack Obama. He criticized the Obama administration for what he saw as "appeasing" Iran and Russia, and blamed Obama for the outbreak of the war in Ukraine in 2014. In May 2016, Hanson argued that Obama failed to maintain a credible threat of deterrence and that "the next few months may prove the most dangerous since World War II."

== Personal life ==
On June 18, 1977, Hanson married Cara Webb. They had three children—two daughters and a son. The couple divorced in 2005. In 2013, Hanson married Jennifer Heyne. In 2014, Hanson's younger daughter, Susannah, died of leukemia.

Hanson's mother, sister-in-law and maternal aunt have also died of cancer.

Hanson had surgery to remove a mucinous adenocarcinoma from his lung on December 31, 2025 at Stanford. He then suffered complications due to an arterial aneurism which led to an extended recovery.

Hanson resides on a farm outside of Selma in California's Central Valley, which has been in his family since the 1870s.

== Works ==
- Warfare and Agriculture in Classical Greece. University of California Press, 1983. ISBN 0-520-21025-5. Rev. ed. 1998.
- The Western Way of War: Infantry Battle in Classical Greece. Alfred A. Knopf, 1989. 2nd. ed. 2000. ISBN 0-394-57188-6
- Hoplites: The Classical Greek Battle Experience, editor, Routledge, 1991. ISBN 0-415-04148-1
- The Other Greeks: The Family Farm and the Agrarian Roots of Western Civilization, Free Press, 1995. ISBN 0-02-913751-9
- Fields Without Dreams: Defending the Agrarian Idea, Free Press, 1996. ISBN 0-684-82299-7
- Who Killed Homer? The Demise of Classical Education and the Recovery of Greek Wisdom, with John Heath, Encounter Books, 1998. ISBN 1-893554-26-0
- The Soul of Battle: From Ancient Times to the Present Day, How Three Great Liberators Vanquished Tyranny, Free Press, 1999. ISBN 0-684-84502-4
- The Wars of the Ancient Greeks: And the Invention of Western Military Culture, Cassell, 1999. ISBN 0-304-35222-5
- The Land Was Everything: Letters from an American Farmer, Free Press, 2000. ISBN 0-684-84501-6
- Bonfire of the Humanities: Rescuing the Classics in an Impoverished Age, with John Heath and Bruce S. Thornton, ISI Books, 2001. ISBN 1-882926-54-4
- Carnage and Culture: Landmark Battles in the Rise of Western Power, Doubleday, 2001. ISBN 0-385-50052-1
  Published in the UK as Why the West Has Won: Carnage and Culture from Salamis to Vietnam, Faber, 2001. ISBN 0-571-20417-1
- An Autumn of War: What America Learned from September 11 and the War on Terrorism, Anchor Books, 2002. ISBN 1-4000-3113-3 A collection of essays, mostly from National Review, covering events occurring between September 11, 2001, and January 2002
- Mexifornia: A State of Becoming, Encounter Books, 2003. ISBN 1-893554-73-2
- Ripples of Battle: How Wars Fought Long Ago Still Determine How We Fight, How We Live, and How We Think, Doubleday, 2003. ISBN 0-385-50400-4
- Between War and Peace: Lessons from Afghanistan and Iraq, Random House, 2004. ISBN 0-8129-7273-2. A collection of essays, mostly from National Review, covering events occurring between January 2002 and July 2003
- A War Like No Other: How the Athenians and Spartans Fought the Peloponnesian War, Random House, 2005. ISBN 1-4000-6095-8
- The Father of Us All: War and History, Ancient and Modern, Bloomsbury Press, 2010. ISBN 978-1-60819-165-9
- The End of Sparta: A Novel, Bloomsbury Press, 2011. ISBN 978-1-60819-164-2
- The Savior Generals: How Five Great Commanders Saved Wars That Were Lost – From Ancient Greece to Iraq, Bloomsbury Press, 2013. ISBN 978-1-6081-9163-5
- The Second World Wars: How the First Global Conflict Was Fought and Won, Basic Books, 2017. ISBN 978-0465066988
- The Case for Trump, Basic Books, 2019. ISBN 978-1541673540
- The Dying Citizen: How Progressive Elites, Tribalism, and Globalization Are Destroying the Idea of America, Basic Books, 2021. ISBN 978-1541647534
- "Imperialism: Lessons From History". Imprimis. 52 (7/8). Hillsdale, MI: Hillsdale College: 1–6. July–August 2023. ISSN 0277-8432.
- The End of Everything: How Wars Descend into Annihilation, Basic Books, 2024. ISBN 978-1541673526
- The Counterrevolution: The Fall and Rise of Donald Trump and the MAGA Movement, Basic Books, 2026. ISBN 978-1541607828
