= Thyreophoroi =

Type of infantry soldier

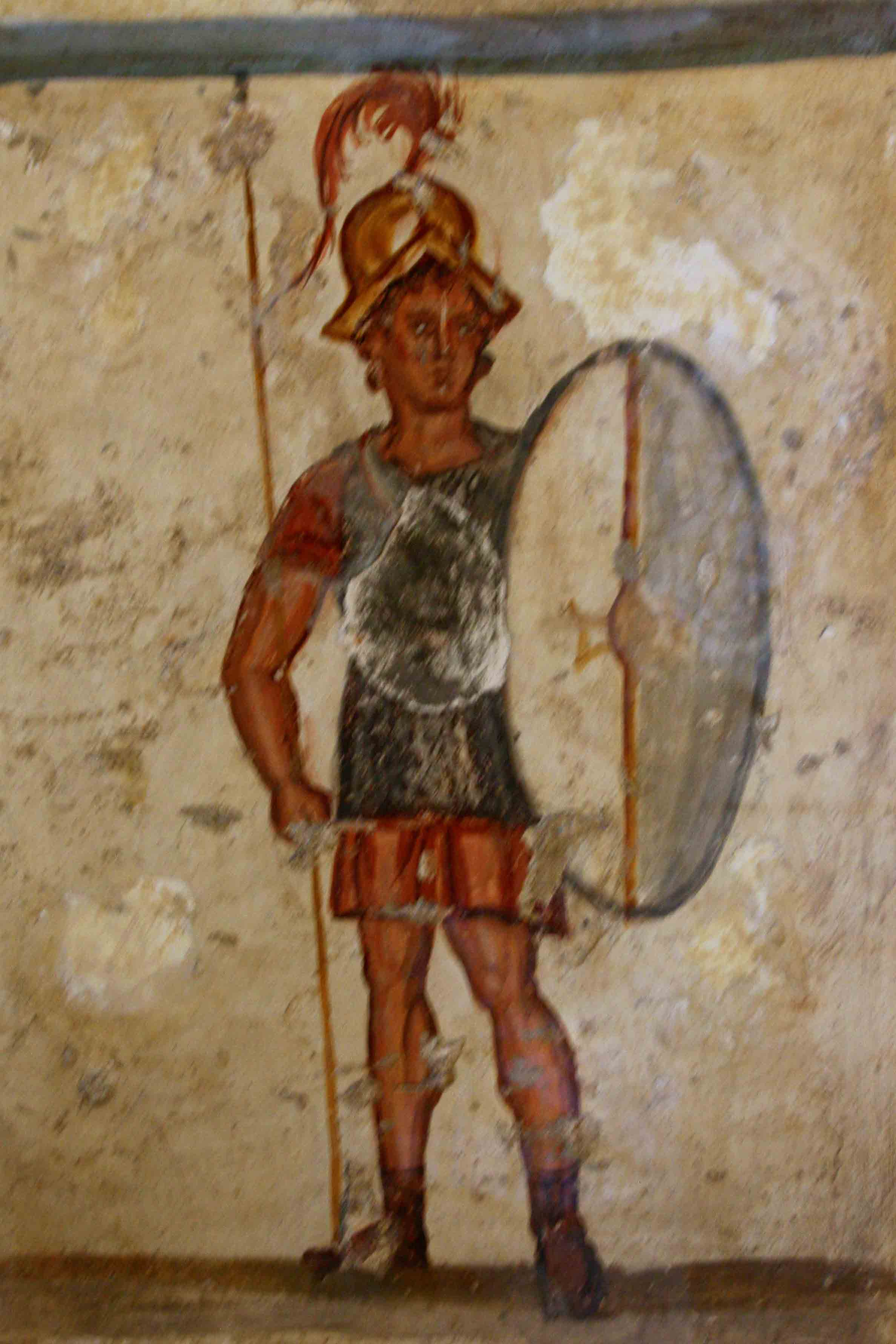
Fresco of an ancient Macedonian soldier (thorakitai) wearing chainmail armor and bearing a thureos shield; 3rd century BC

The thyreophoroi or thureophoroi (Greek: θυρεοφόροι; sing.: thureophoros/thyreophoros, θυρεοφόρος) were a type of infantry soldier, common in the 3rd to 1st centuries BC, who carried a large oval shield called a thyreos which had a type of metal strip boss and a central spine. They were armed with a long thrusting spear, javelins and a sword. They also usually wore an iron or bronze Macedonian helmet.

== Role ==
Thyreophoroi are usually distinguished from both skirmishers and the phalanx and seem to have operated in a role intermediate between the two types. They often supported light troops and seemed to be capable of operating in a similar manner to peltasts. The thyreophoroi were well suited to the strategic needs of smaller states, mainly border defense. They were mobile and could rapidly advance over varied terrain. According to Plutarch, they could fight as skirmishers and then fall back, assume spears and tighten the ranks, forming a phalanx.

== Development ==
In the 4th century BC, the main type of mercenary infantry was the peltast, to the extent that this became a synonym for mercenaries in general. A few illustrations of the early 3rd century BC still show a small round pelte shield in use but by the mid-3rd century BC it has been replaced by the thyreos. The thureos was probably originally an adapted form of a Celtic shield, in the aftermath of the Gallic invasion of Greece. Thracian and Illyrian infantry probably adopted the shield before the ancient Greeks. However, it has been suggested that the thureos was brought to Greece after Pyrrhus' campaigns in Italy, as his Oscan allies and Roman enemies used the scutum. The thyreos was adopted by the Aetolian and the Achaean Leagues and by the Boeotians in the 270s BC.

Plutarch describes Achaean citizens equipped with the thureos as skirmishing at a distance like peltasts but also as having spears for hand-to-hand combat. Despite their spears, we are told that the thyreophoroi were not reliable in hand-to-hand fighting owing to their nature as light troops. Mercenary thyreophoroi were not only from Greece but could be from other areas such as Anatolia. Alongside this form of fighting, the thyreomachia, fighting with swords and the thyreos, was developed into an athletic event in many Greek competitions. A related troop type was the thorakites, which were generally heavier and wore mail armor.

The Achaean League under Philopoemen abandoned the thyreos around 208–207 BC in favor of the heavier Macedonian phalanx, although the citizens of Megalopolis, an Achaean city, had adopted the Macedonian style in 222 BC after Antigonus III Doson gave the city bronze shields to form a contingent of epilektoi armed as chalkaspides ('Bronze-Shields'). By the end of the 3rd century BC the thyreophoros was no longer the dominant troop type among the smaller Greek states, having been replaced by the Macedonian-style phalanx, except for the Aetolians.

== Illustrations ==
Thyreophoroi are frequently illustrated in grave paintings from Alexandria and Sidon. They can also be seen in terracottas from Seleucia on the Tigris.

== See also ==
- Thorakitai, a similar type of soldier
- Thyreophora, a clade of dinosaurs

== Sources ==
- Head, Duncan (1982). Armies of the Macedonian and Punic Wars. WRG.
- Sabin, Philip & van Wees, Hans & Whitby, Michael (eds.) (2007). "The Cambridge History of Greek and Roman Warfare: Volume 1, Greece, The Hellenistic World and the Rise of Rome". Cambridge University Press
