= Thyreos =

Shield used by Hellenistic Armies

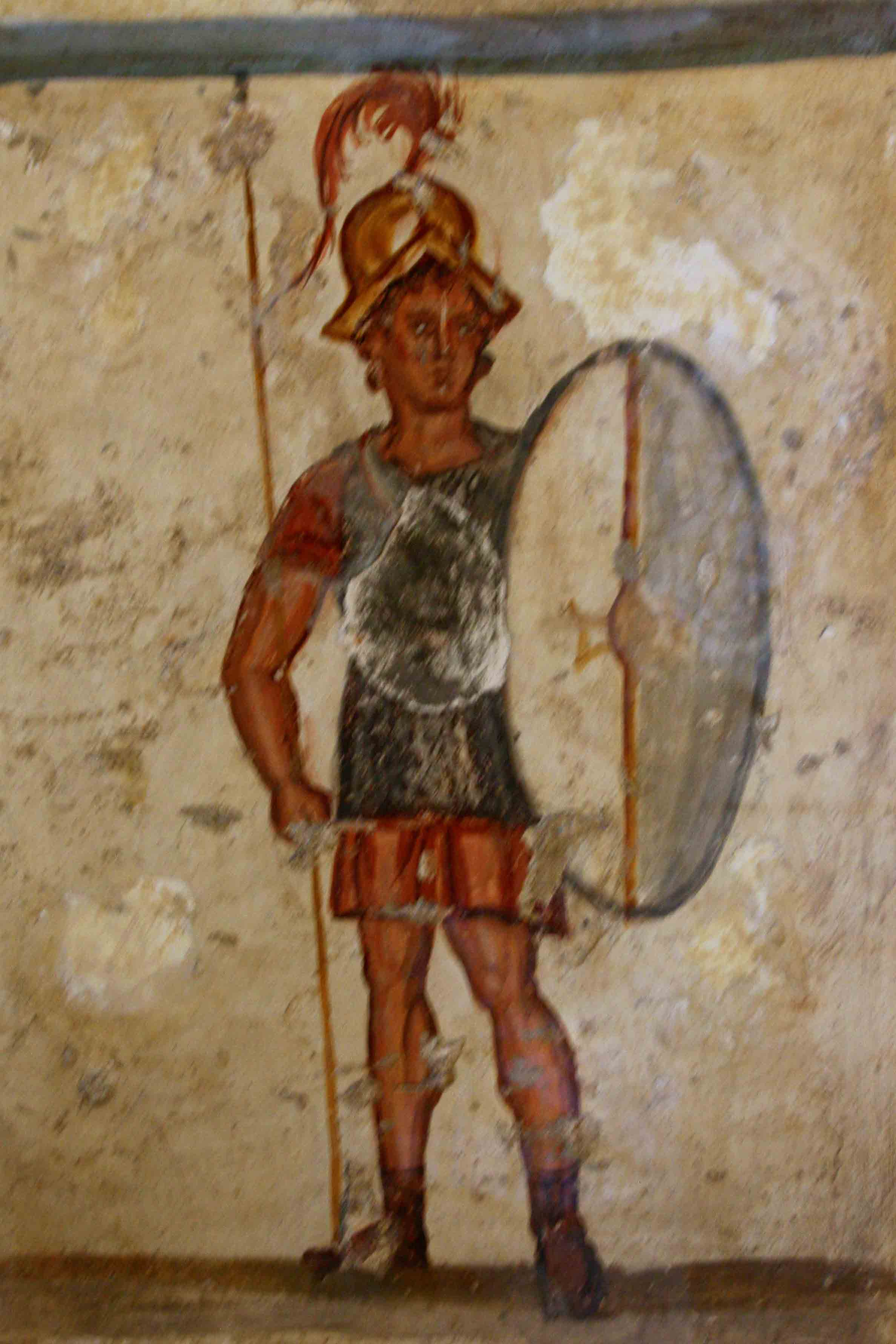
Fresco of an ancient Macedonian soldier bearing a thyreos shield. Archeological museum in Istanbul.

A thyreos or thureos (Ancient Greek: θυρεός) was a large oval shield which was commonly used in Hellenistic armies from the 3rd century BC onwards. It was adopted from the Galatians, probably first by the Illyrians, then by the Thracians before becoming common in ancient Greece. Troops who carried it were known as thyreophoroi. It was made of wood covered with leather and had a spined boss. It was carried using a central handgrip. Some variants of the shield were nearly rectangular: the name thyreos derives from the word thyra (θύρα), "door", reflecting its oblong shape.

== See also ==
- Hellenistic armies
- Antigonid Macedonian army
