= Hellenistic armies =

Armies of the Hellenistic kingdoms

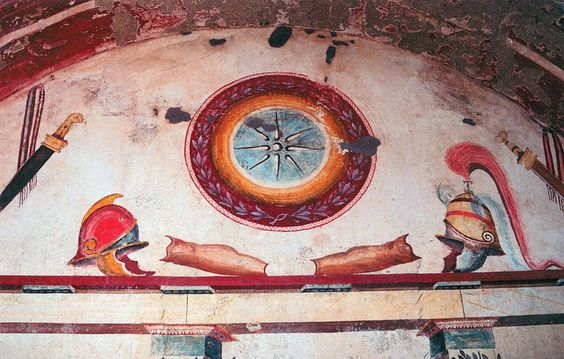
- Ancient Macedonian paintings of Hellenistic-era military armor, arms, and gear from the Tomb of Lyson and Kallikles in ancient Mieza (modern-day Lefkadia), Imathia, Central Macedonia, Greece, dated 2nd century BC.
- Leaders: Eumenes; Antigonus I Seleucus I Nicator; Demetrius Poliorcetes; Ptolemy I Soter; Lysimachus; Pyrrhus of Epirus; Antigonus Gonatas; Xanthippus (Spartan commander); Ptolemy III; Cleomenes III; Antigonus Doson; Antiochus III the Great; Philip V of Macedon; Philopoemen; Demetrius I of Bactria; Menander I Mithridates VI; Cleopatra
- Allegiance: various Hellenistic states
- Active regions: Hellenistic world

The Hellenistic armies is a term that refers to the various armies of the successor kingdoms to the Hellenistic period, emerging soon after the death of Alexander the Great in 323 BC, when the Macedonian empire was split between his successors, known as the Diadochi (Ancient Greek: Διάδοχοι).

Initially, the Hellenistic armies were very similar to those commanded by Alexander the Great, but during the era of the Epigonoi (Ἐπίγονοι, "Successors") the differences became obvious, with the Diadochi growing to favor large masses of soldiers rather than smaller, well-trained ones, and weight was valued over maneuverability. The limited availability of Greek conscripts in the east led to an increasing dependence on mercenary forces, whereas the Hellenistic armies in the west were continuously involved in wars, which soon exhausted local manpower, paving the way for Roman supremacy in the region.

Three major Hellenistic states were the Seleucid Empire, the Ptolemaic kingdom and Macedon under the Antigonid dynasty. Other Hellenistic states were Epirus under Pyrrhus, the Kingdom of Lysimachus, the Kingdom of Pergamum, the Kingdom of Pontus, the Greco-Bactrian Kingdom and Indo-Greek Kingdom, the Achaean League and the Aetolian League, and the city states of Rhodes, Sparta, Syracuse, Athens, and others.

== Numerical strength ==
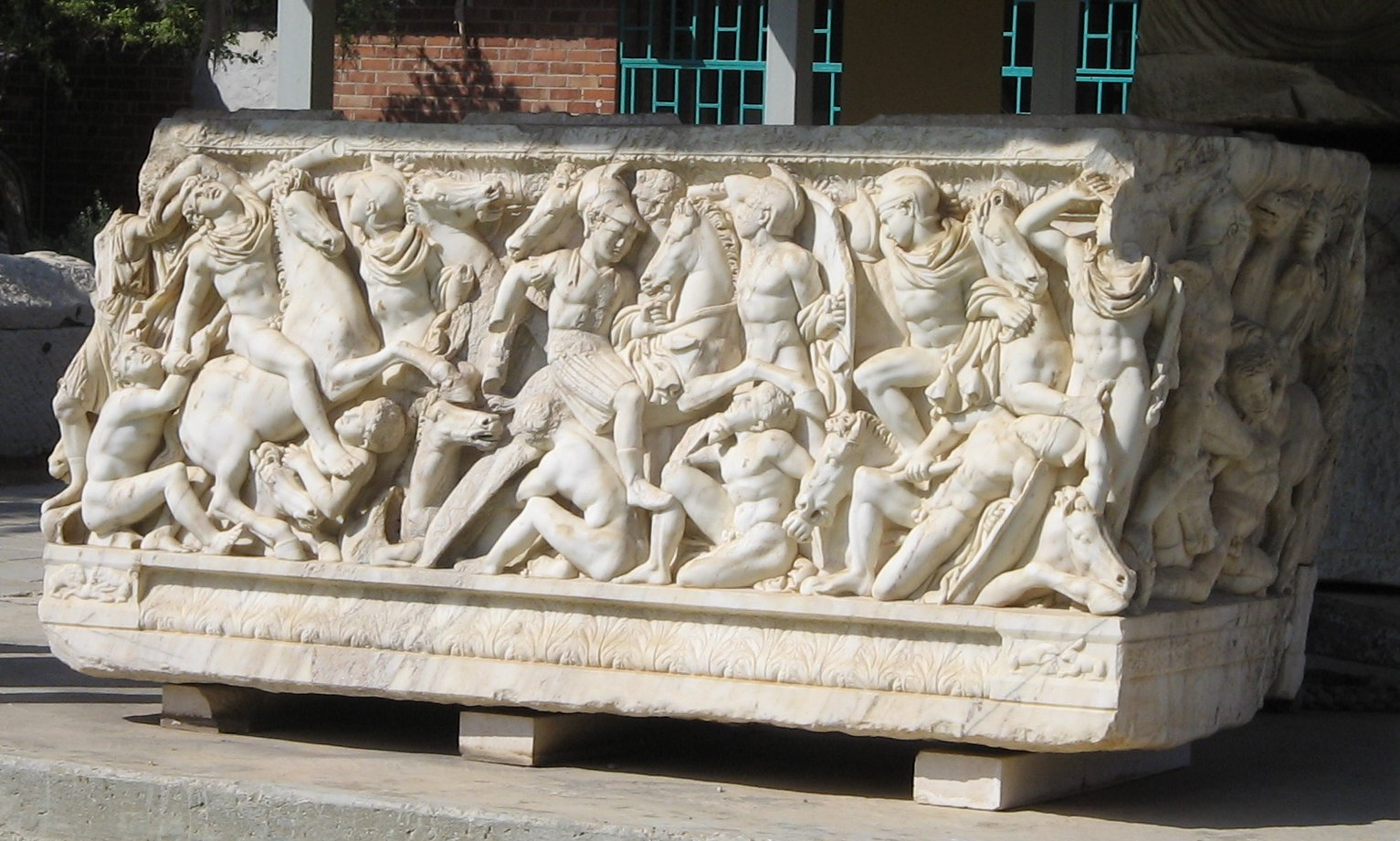
Hellenistic soldiers in a relief of a sarcophagus from Ashkelon, Israel

The Diadochi were capable of deploying some of the largest armies of their day, and could easily outmatch the numerical strength of either Phillip's or Alexander's full strength contingents. However, the size of the armies participating in different campaigns could vary extremely, from a few thousand to over 70,000 soldiers. Of these armies, outside Greece, only a fraction would have been of Greek origin, the rest being allied contingents and conscripts from the local population.

=== Manpower and the state ===
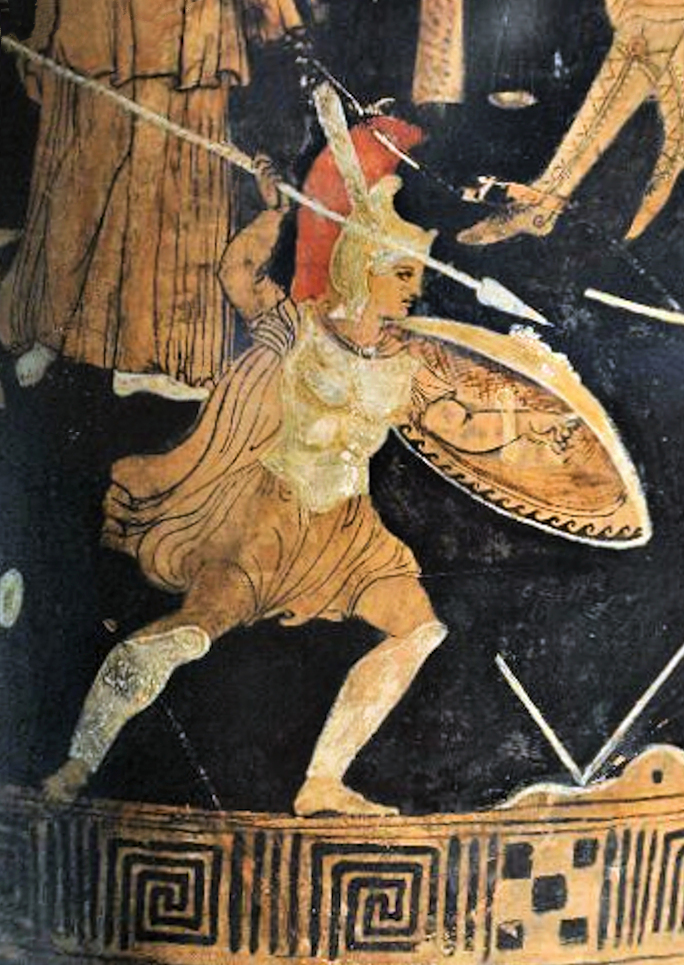
Greek soldier in combat, c. 300 BC (Depiction of Achilles).

Lack of manpower was a serious concern for many Hellenistic rulers. The disparity between the manpower reserves available to Rome and to any other Hellenistic monarch had a profound influence on the way in which the opponents made war. Roman generals could more easily risk defeat in battle, while for Hellenistic generals, a defeat might cripple their manpower base for nearly a generation. Many states had to rely on mercenaries to bulk up their citizen forces: For example, the army of the Achaean League under Aratus of Sicyon was re-organized to contain a permanent corps of mercenaries that numbered 8,000 foot soldiers and 500 on horseback, compared with the corps of picked Achaean troops, which numbered only 3,000 foot and 500 horse.

To take another example, by the mid-third century BC, the Spartan citizen population had decreased to a tiny fraction of what it had been at the time of the Persian Wars (Cleomenes' army could only field about 5,000 men). The inchoate reforms of Agis IV around 240 BC had failed after a reaction by those opposed to the reforms. The problem of the lack of man-at-arms was then taken up by Cleomenes III of Sparta, who attempted to address it by his radical reforms. Cleomenes III launched a coup against his rivals at home and used their demise to push forward a reform to increase Spartan manpower. In 227 BC, Cleomenes cancelled all debts, pooled and divided the large estates and increased the citizen body by enfranchising 5,000 Perioikoi and 'metics' (resident foreigners). Before long, he increased the citizen body further by allowing Helots to buy their freedom for five minae and therefore he "acquired 500 talents, some of which he used to arm 2,000 men in the Macedonian fashion as phalangites". However, the defeat at Sellasia in 222 BC and the attendant great loss of manpower forced a reliance on mercenary soldiers, who were the basis of power for Machanidas and Nabis, his successors.

The extreme losses affected Philip V of Macedon greatly, especially after his defeat at the Battle of Cynoscephalae in 197 BC. With such a small population, and such drastic losses in battle, the Antigonid king had to think radically as to how to improve his nation's performance in the next war. In between the Second and Third Macedonian Wars, Philip V embarked on a major reform and re-organization of the kingdom. Expansion could secure "the great reservoir of available man-power" that lay north in Thrace. Philip then transported segments of the populations of the coastal cities to the northern frontiers and moved those Thracians south. This, combined with economic and political moves, re-built Macedonia and allowed for Perseus, Philip's successor, to be in a stronger position. Perseus had enough grain to last the army ten years - without drawing on harvests - enough money to hire 10,000 mercenaries for ten years, and field an army of 43,000 soldiers, a significant improvement compared to the situation of Philip V at Cynoscephalae in 197 BC, who fielded an army of 25,500 men.

The eastern kingdoms of the Ptolemaic, Seleucid, Graeco-Bactrian and Indo Greek kingdoms, had an even more problematic situation. The basis of their militaries relied on Greeks, which were not common to the areas that they ruled over. In order to overcome this, these kingdoms set up military colonies, known as Klerouchoi, to settle mercenaries and others from Greece. The system would allow for the colonists to be given a plot of land and in return they would provide military service when needed. In Ptolemaic Egypt, for example, soldiers and officers were given rewards "In exchange for military service, whenever needed." W.W. Tarn even suggests that the Greek (known to the Indians as "Yavanas") population in India may not have been as small as one would suppose, stating "There may well have been many more Yavanas...than we should suppose; we may have to reckon with a considerable number of men, adventurers or mercenaries from the west."

== Typical units and formations ==
=== Hellenistic infantry ===
==== The Phalanx ====
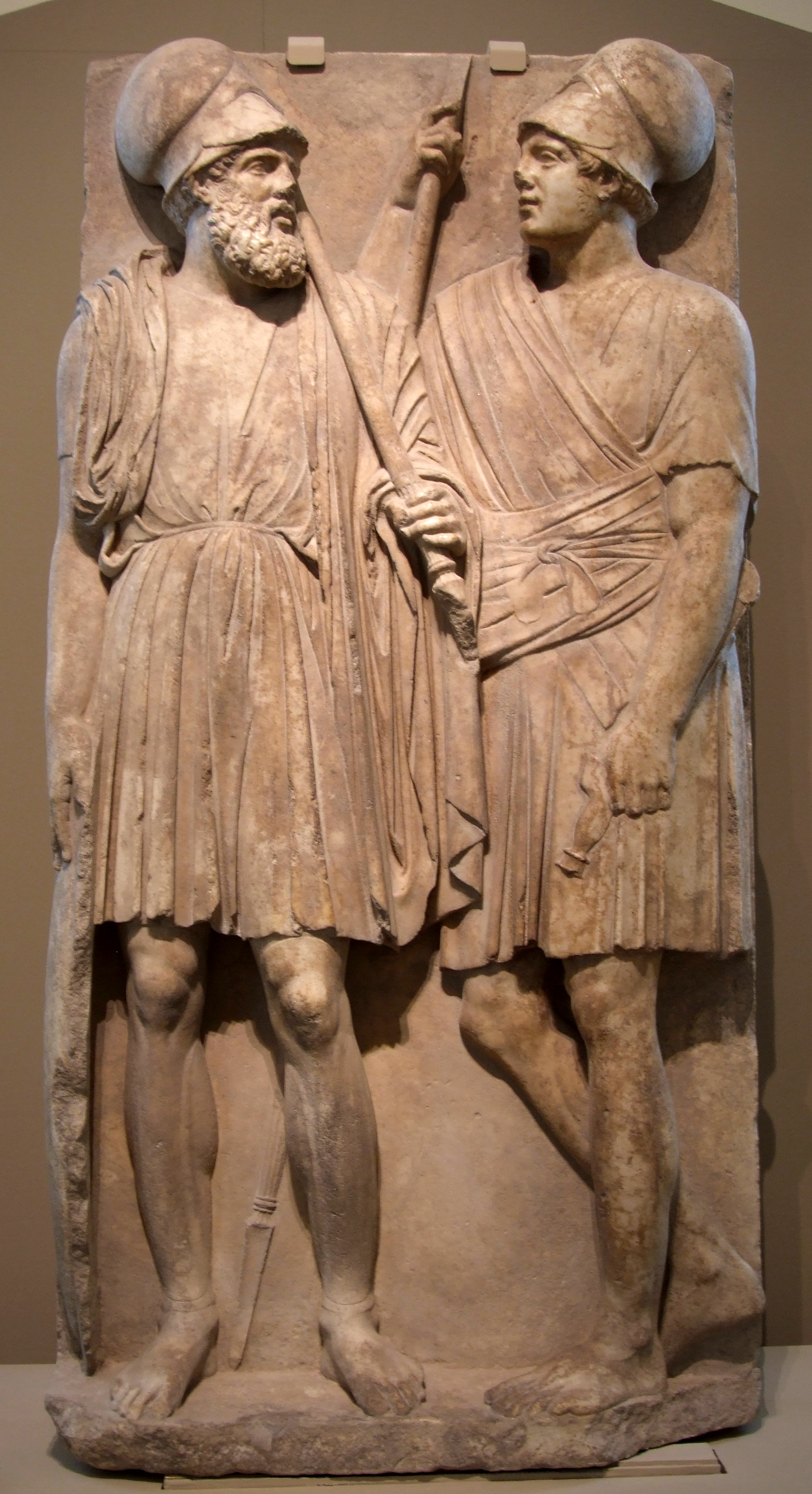
Stele with two Hellenistic soldiers of the Bosporan Kingdom; from Taman Peninsula (Yubileynoe), southern Russia, 3rd quarter of the 4th century BC; marble, Pushkin Museum.

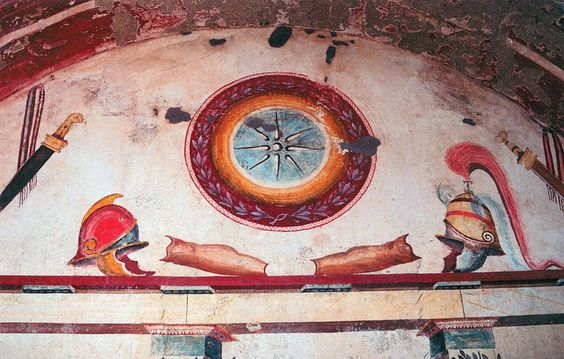
Ancient Macedonian paintings of Hellenistic-era military armor, arms, and gear from the Tomb of Lyson and Kallikles in ancient Mieza (modern-day Lefkadia), Imathia, Central Macedonia, Greece, dated 2nd century BC.

The Hellenistic armies based their strength on the pike-bearing phalanx, the legacy of Philip II and Alexander the Great. Throughout the age of the Diadochi and the Epigonoi, the phalanx, as the line of the pikemen was commonly referred to by ancient authors, remained the backbone of armies as diverse as those of Seleucus I Nicator, Pyrrhus of Epirus, Antiochos III and Philip V. The phalanx was an infantry formation, characterized by dense ranks and pikes (sarissas). Their soldiers (known as phalangites) ranged from professional warriors, drilled in tactics, weapon use and formation, typically of Greek origin; to trained, non-Greek villagers, as was the case in the army of Ptolemy Philopator, the victor of Raphia. Certain reforms in the weight of the phalangite equipment and the conscription methods used turned the phalanx from a maneuverable formation into a bulky, slow-moving steam roller, whose charge no enemy was able to withstand. Maneuvers like the fake retreat of Phillip II at Chaeronea or the oblique advance of Alexander at Arbela were never again attempted, but, as long as the phalanx remained on relatively level terrain and its flanks were kept secure, it was not conquered by any other formation. Although it has been argued that the role of the phalanx on the battlefield was to act as an anchor for the entire army, holding the enemy in place, pushing him back, exerting a heavy toll on enemy morale, while the cavalry struck the enemy flanks and delivered the fatal blow to cripple their opponents, in most battles it was used as the main weapon to achieve victory.

Equipment varied over the years, and was also dependent on the geographical region, the preference/wealth of the ruler, and the assets of the individual soldier.

Helmets ranged from simple, open-faced affairs to stylized Thracian models (complete with mask-like cheek protectors that often imitated a human face). Historians argue about how common body armor would have been among phalangites, especially those in the middle ranks, but when it was worn it ranged from a cuirass of hardened linen (the linothorax), that may or may not have been reinforced/decorated with metal scales to metallic (typically bronze) breastplates.

The phalangite's shield - long misconstrued thanks to its description as a "buckler" by several writers - was a 2-foot (0.61 m)-diameter affair and less concave than the hoplite's aspis. It was secured by both a shoulder harness and a forearm brace, allowing the off-hand to release the hand grip and make wielding the enormous sarissa pike possible. Metallic greaves were also worn to cover the shins of the soldiers as they stood their ground, especially by the front and rear-most ranks.

The primary weapon of the phalangite was the sarissa, a massive spear that ranged from 16 feet (mid-late 4th century BC) to as much as 22 feet (near the nadir of the phalanx's development). First made famous by Philip of Macedon, it allowed Macedonian infantry to "outrange" the opposition's existing spear formations by several feet. The sarissa would have been largely useless in single combat, but a compact, forward-facing infantry formation employing it would have been almost impossible to challenge. The first five ranks of the phalanx would have their sarissa projecting horizontally to face the enemy, with the remaining ranks angling theirs in a serried fashion, often leaning against their fellows' backs. If front-rankers were killed, those behind would lower their spears and step forward to maintain a solid frontline.

In the event of close combat, or in circumstances where the sarissa was impractical, a variety of swords were employed - the classic xiphos, the kopis and the makhaira, for example. Any sword-fighting in the vicinity of the phalanx's front was complicated by the sarissa projecting from the 2nd-5th ranks around the 1st rank combatants.

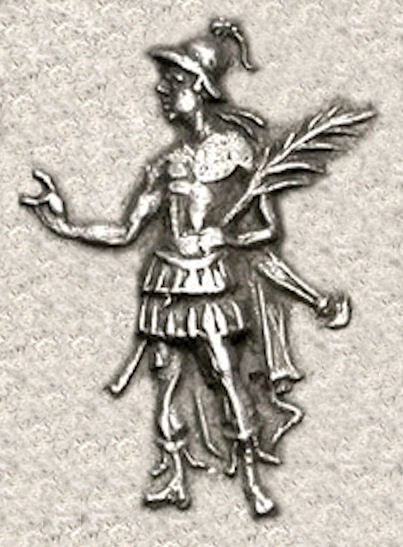
A common Hellenistic military uniform consisting of a helmet, chlamys, linothorax with pleats, boots, and carrying a xiphos sword, shown on an Indo-Greek coin.

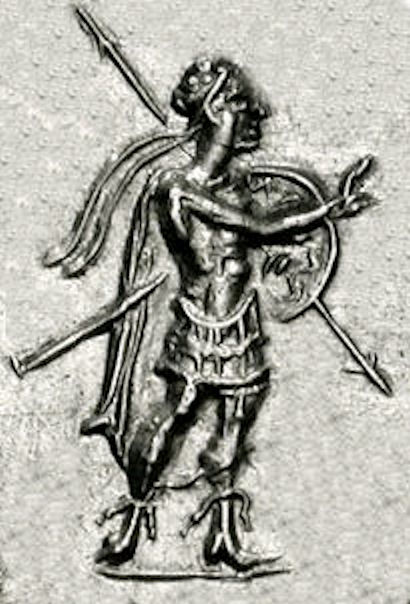
Another example of a Hellenistic soldier, with similar gear but shown carrying a spear and round aspis shield; shown on an Indo-Greek coin of Strato.

The primary drawback of the phalanx was its vulnerability to attacks from the rear and flanks. This is the reason why it depended on the units on its flanks to at least hold off the enemy until he would naturally break from the phalanx's irresistible pressure. It also had a tendency to fracture, when led across broken terrain for extended periods in close-ordered battle formation. The Romans would later be able to use this weakness against the phalanx as their more mobile maniples could withstand the pressure of the phalanx longer than more traditional formations, thus earning valuable time for their wings to outflank it, as at Cynoscephalae and Magnesia, or for the phalanx to lose its cohesion due to prolonged movement forward or advancement through unfavorable terrain, as at Pydna. Yet, regardless of the many Roman victories against the Hellenistic Kingdoms, the legion never won against a phalanx by frontal assault. Even at Pydna, it took the strange withdrawal of the Macedonian cavalry for the Romans to finally outflank the phalanx and claim a costly victory.

As the reign of the Diadochi persisted from the late 4th century to the mid-first century BC, they grew to rely more and more on an increasingly heavier and longer-speared phalanx to ensure victory. Complementary arms of the later Hellenistic armies were neglected, fell into disuse, or became the province of unreliable mercenaries and subject peoples. Sound and creative tactics became increasingly rare as a result.

Historians and students of the field alike have often compared the Hellenistic-era phalanx with the Roman legion, in an attempt to ascertain which of the formations was truly better. Detractors of the former point out that in many engagements between the two - such as at Pydna and Cynosephalae - the legion was the clear victor, and hence represented a superior system. Opposing schools of thought, however, point to the Pyrrhic, Hannibalic and Mithridatic victories as evidence to the contrary. Finally, one might note that these were not conflicts that solely featured Republican Roman Legionaries engaged against Hellenistic phalangites. The Roman victories of Magnesia, Cynoscephalae and Pydna were won by armies that included thousands of non-Roman (often Hellenic) cavalry, elephants, as well as assorted heavy and light infantry. Such a comparison was also attempted in the ancient days, as is attested by Polybius' own effort to explain why the Macedonian sarissa was eventually conquered by the Roman gladius. In the end, such a juxtaposition can be misleading, since both infantry formations had clear advantages and disadvantages that were historically oftentimes exploited.

==== Onomatology and development of the Hellenistic phalanx ====
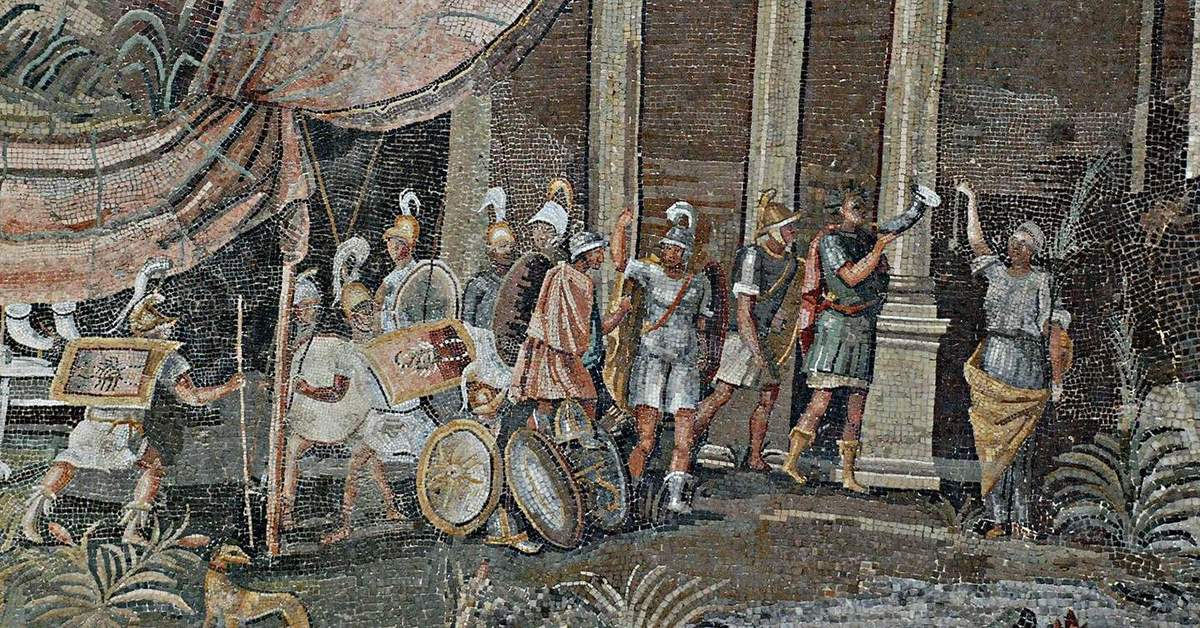
Hellenistic soldiers c. 100 BC, Ptolemaic Kingdom, Egypt; detail of the Nile mosaic of Palestrina.

Numerous individual units of the phalanx infantry are attested in use during the Hellenistic period. Some of the old Alexandrian unit names were kept and units were named after Alexander's. An example of this are the Argyraspides ('silver shields'), who were originally a unit of Alexander's most fearsome and disciplined veterans. However, they were disbanded not long after having surrendered their commander Eumenes to Antigonus the One-Eyed. The name, however, was kept alive and formed into a corps of the Seleucid army. Livy describes them as a Royal Cohort in the army of Antiochus III the Great. Fighting in phalanx formation, the Argyraspides were present at Raphia (217 BC) and Magnesia (190 BC). Chosen from across the kingdom, they constituted a corps of roughly 10,000 men. By the time of Antiochus IV Epiphanes' parade at Daphne in 166 BC, the Argyraspides are counted as being only 5,000 strong. However, Bar-Kochva is of the opinion that the 5,000 men dressed and armed in the 'Roman' style counts for the other half of the corps. This is because the men of the 'Roman Contingent' are described as being in their prime of life.

In the Ptolemaic army the Graeco-Macedonian troops formed the phalanx. But Ptolemy IV Philopator and his ministers reformed the army in order to keep up manpower by allowing the native Egyptian warrior class, the Machimoi, into the phalanx. Up until that point the Machimoi had only performed auxiliary duties such as archery, skirmishing and so on. The Machmioi Epilektoi, or 'Picked Machimoi', first saw service at the battle of Raphia and from then on were featured in more important positions within the Ptolemaic army.

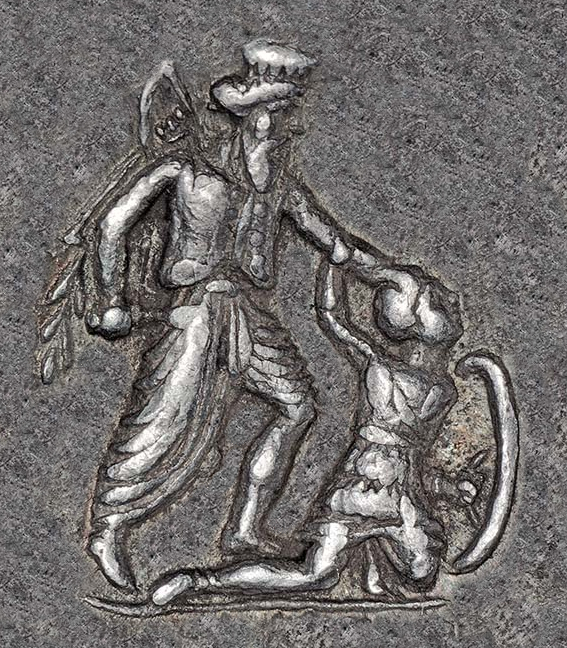
A Persian ruler slaying an armoured, possibly Greek, hoplite, on a drachm of 3rd-2nd century BC Persis ruler Vahbarz (Oborzos). This possibly refers to the events related by Polyainos (Strat. 7.40), in which Vahbarz (Oborzos) is said to have killed 3000 Seleucid military settlers.

It was customary for the Hellenistic warlords to name individual units of phalangites according to the color of their shields. Thus, the phalanx of the Hellenistic armies used terms such as Chrysaspides (Greeks: Χρυσάσπιδες 'gold-shields'), Chalkaspides ('bronze-shields') and Leukaspides ('white-shields') to denote formations within their phalanxes, the two latter being important in the composition of the Antigonid phalanx. Antigonus Doson armed the citizens of Megalopolis as Bronze Shields for the Sellasia campaign in 222 BC. These units are mentioned by classical writers when describing the Antigonid army in battle. Although these units most probably ceased to exist after the battle of Pydna in 168 BC, as the Antigonid kingdom had been crushed by Rome. These names were not only limited to the Antigonid (or Achaean) phalanx though. Plutarch tells us of Mithridates VI of Pontus, "The Great", having a corps of 'Chalkaspides' against Sulla at Chaeroneia. The majority of the Seleucid phalanx was probably formed by the two corps that are mentioned in the Daphne Parade of 166 BC, namely the 10,000 Chrysaspides and the 5,000 Chalkaspides. Little else is known specifically about them, although they may have been present at the battle of Beth-Zachariah in 162 BC. Leukaspides are mentioned in the army of Pyrrhus of Epirus on his campaigns in Italy. Under Cleomenes III, the Spartan army was reformed in 228 BC. Until then, the Spartans had merely kept the traditional hoplite spear. Cleomenes created a 4,000-strong phalanx and then formed another phalanx with 2,000 freed helots to counter the Antigonid Leukaspides. Philopoemen reformed the army of the Achaean League into the Macedonian phalanx in 208–207 BC and we are told that, by the end of the 3rd century, the Boeotians did the same, thereby creating the 'Peltophoroi'.

=== Agema ===
The Ptolemaic kingdom and Seleucid Empire also had elite infantry units called Agema, as for the cavalry. In the Battle of Raphia the Ptolemaic army included 3,000 Hypaspists under Eurylochus the Magnesian (the Agema). The agema in the Seleucid army had a full name, the agema of the hypaspists. The absence of mention of them in detailed writings about the Seleucid campaigns may be due to their having retained only the second half of their name, being called the hypaspists. They formed a crack force within the infantry guardsmen corps.

==== Antigonid 'peltasts' ====
In his description of the Battle of Cynoscephalae, Polybius describes a unit called peltasts, a type of shielded, skirmishing, light infantry. It has been suggested that these peltasts were a picked corps, much like Alexander's hypaspists, 'an infantry force...which fought beside the phalanx in battle, but at other times employed for ambushes, forced marches and special expeditions'. The Peltasts were assigned special missions, such as an ambush in Lycestis or the storming of Cephallenia, as shock troops. The elite of the Peltast corps were known as the 'Agema'.

The term peltast was also used by Diodorus Siculus to describe the Iphicratean hoplite, introduced by the Athenian general Iphicrates. These peltasts were equipped with a lighter armor, a longer spear, and a smaller shield. It could be that the peltasts described by Polybius were similarly equipped.

==== Thureophoroi and Thorakitai ====
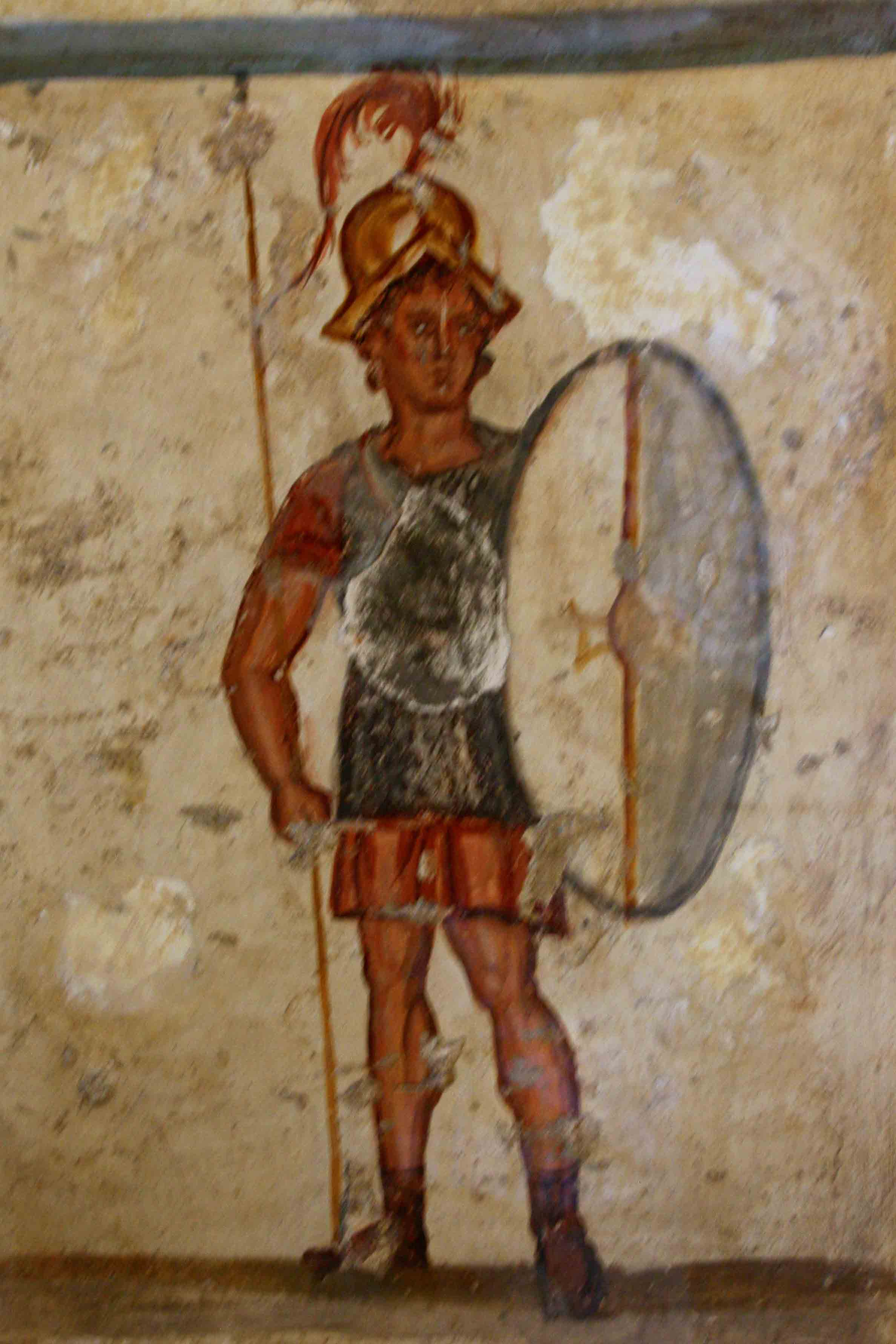
Fresco of an ancient Macedonian soldier (thorakitai) wearing mail armor and bearing a thureos shield.

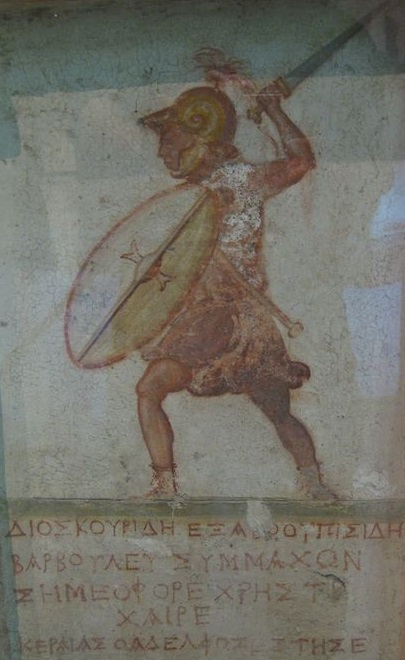
A stele of Dioskourides, dated 2nd century BC, showing a Ptolemaic thureophoros soldier (wielding the thureos shield). It is a characteristic example of the "romanization" of the Ptolemaic army.

New troop types, such as the Thureophoroi and the Thorakitai, were developed. They used the Celtic Thureos shield, of an oval shape that was similar to the shields of the Romans, but flatter. The Thureophoroi were armed with a long thrusting spear, a short sword, and, if needed, javelins. While the Thorakitai were similar to the Thureophoroi, they were more heavily armoured, as their name implies, usually wearing a mail shirt. These troops were used as a link between the light infantry and the phalanx, a form of medium infantry to bridge the gaps. Numerous armies used this form of troop, for example the Achaean League's armies before Philopoemen. By the end of the 3rd century BC, the 'Macedonian' phalanx had become the dominant fighting style even for states such as Sparta.

Both the Thureophoroi and the Thorakitai were able to fight both in a phalanx formation, armed with long spears, or in more loose, irregular formations to be used against enemy light infantry or to occupy difficult terrain.

==== Roman influence on Hellenistic warfare ====
Reforms in the late Seleucid and Ptolemaic armies re-organised them and tried to add some Roman aspects to formations. This, however, would not be out of place as some Roman style tactics were used by Pyrrhus of Epirus in his campaigns against the Romans and by Antigonus III Doson at Sellasia in 222 BC. Pyrrhus and Antigonus both placed units of lighter troops in between the units of their phalanx. This was after Pyrrhus had 'observed the formation of the Roman legions and noticed how mobile they were and how unwieldy were his own forces... He therefore adapted his own formation to the Roman model, deploying light mobile detachments alongside the phalanx'. Philopoemen too used this tactic at Mantinea in 207 BC, making his phalanx more flexible.

Much is made of Polybius' description of 5,000 Seleucid infantryman in 166 BC armed in the 'Roman' fashion at a parade at Daphne. 'Romanized' troops are also mentioned in battle against the Maccabees. These reforms were probably undertaken by Antiochus IV because of several factors. Firstly, Antiochus IV 'had spent part of his early life in Rome and had acquired rather an excessive admiration for Rome's power and methods'. Secondly, to re-train the army in this manner would allow it to perform better in the Seleucid empire's eastern satrapies beyond the river Tigris, which were of high importance to Seleucid rulers from Antiochus III through to Demetrius II. Thirdly, changing their equipment and training would add to their fighting capability and efficiency, hence making the army more maneuverable. It has been suggested that the fact that these 5,000 men were marching at the head of the army was meant to show Antiochus IV's intention of reforming the entire Seleucid army along Roman lines, though whether or not this complete reform actually took place is unknown. The true extent of the adoption of Roman techniques is unknown; some have suggested that the infantry are in fact more likely to be Thureophoroi or Thorakitai, troops armed with an oval shield of the Celtic type, a thrusting spear and javelins. The Thureophoroi and Thorakitai pre-date any major Roman military influence and while similarly equipped and fought in a similar manner, had actually evolved independently from the Roman legions.

Stelae from Hermopolis show a Ptolemaic unit having a standard-bearer and other staff attached. This unit was like a Roman Maniple, being composed of two smaller units led by a Hekatontarch (i.e. a Centurion). The title of Hekatontarch appeared around 150 BC. As well as this, Asclepiodotus describes in his 'Tactica' a new institution, the Syntagma, which had a standard-bearer, other staff and was composed of two smaller units led by Hekatontarchs. The Phalangarkhia, also described by Asclepiodotus, was about the size of a Roman Legion in strength. The potential Roman influence would have been great. In Ptolemaic Egypt, Roman adventurers and veterans are found commonly serving under the Ptolemies. Romans are found in Ptolemaic service as early as 252-1 BC. The Ptolemaic army was odd in that, out of all the Hellenistic armies, it was the only army where you could find Romans in Greek service. As Sekunda suggests 'such individuals would have spread knowledge of Roman military systems within the Ptolemaic military and political establishment'.

However, there are numerous aspects of the Roman army that were not carried into the Ptolemaic and Seleucid ones. For example, the differentiation of the Hastati, Principes and Triarii, or the integration of light-armed troops into the infantry structure. Hence, because of this, there was no Hellenistic equivalent to the Cohort. Instead, there was a system of larger units that had no relation to Roman organization. In terms of equipment, most of these so-called 'Romanized' troops did not abandon their traditional spear for a sword, which the Hastati and Principles abandoned between the 3rd and 2nd Century BC. Also the Romans used the pila, while Greek troops tended to use local variations of Javelins. Also similarity of equipment in regards to helmets and chainmail can be explained by Celtic influence experienced by both the Greeks and Romans at a similar time. In this sense, we can only assume that the Hellenistic kingdoms did reform and re-organize their troops in some regards along Roman lines, but these appear to be superficial at best and quite possibly the result of convergent evolution, with both cultures influencing each other.

By the time of Mithridates VI, we are told that the Pontic army had troops armed in the Roman fashion and by 86 BC Mithridates had created an army of 120,000 such troops. This was after an alliance between Mithridates and Sertorius, an enemy of Sulla, in which Sertorius sent a military mission to reorganize Mithridates' army along Roman lines. These 'Roman' troops fought alongside the Pontic phalanx. 'Legions' of this sort are described by Julius Caesar in his campaigns against Juba in Numidia and alongside Deiotarus of Galatia whilst in the Middle East. If anything, these forces, as described by N. Sekunda, are nothing more than ersatz-legions.

=== Hellenistic cavalry ===
==== Cavalry organisation ====
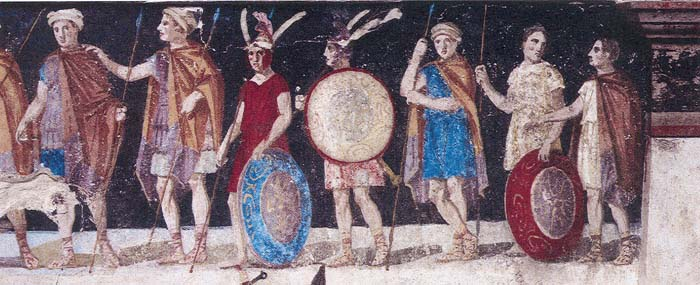
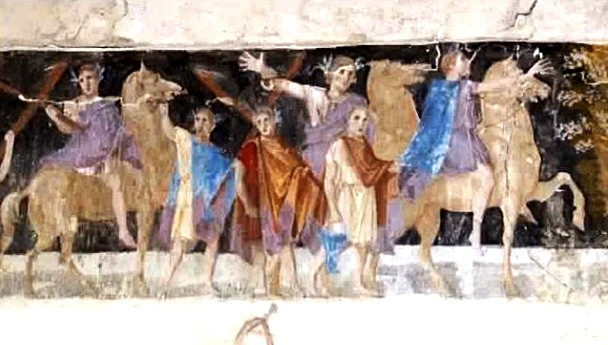
An ancient fresco of Macedonian soldiers from the tomb of Agios Athanasios, Thessaloniki, Greece, 4th century BC.

The cavalry organization differed in the various Hellenistic states. Different variants of tactical formations were used to organize the state's cavalry, although there are cross-overs and similarities between different kingdoms. The Boeotian League's cavalry was commanded by a Hipparchos and each cavalry squadron (ile, pl. ilai) was led by an ilarchos. They also had a tarantinarchos who commanded the League's Tarantine skirmishing cavalry.

The Aetolian League became well known for its cavalry and, by the end of the 3rd century, they were considered the best in Greece. Despite this fact, cavalry remained only a small proportion of its total military force. We can deduce this from the 400 cavalry accompanying 3,000 foot on campaign in 218 BC. All we know of specific organisation is a reference to oulamoi, small squadrons of uncertain strength.

The cavalry of the Achaean League was supposedly inefficient. Philopoemen, in the late 3rd century, having already reformed the foot soldiers into a Macedonian-style phalanx, also reformed the cavalry. The Achaean cavalry was organised into lochoi, files of eight men, who were then grouped into dilochiai, double files of 16, then grouped into oulamoi of 32, ilai of 64, hipparchiai of 128 and syntagmata of 256.

The Antigonid kingdom of Macedon's cavalry only constituted a small fraction of the army. Duncan Head estimates this fraction as 5-10% of the total strength of the Antigonid armies. This may well be due to over-campaigning, high casualties or even because many of the Macedonian noblemen who formed much of the heavy cavalry of Philip II and Alexander went east and never came back. But, by the time of Philip V and Perseus, cavalry strength had slowly increased. Philip V had a cavalry force of 400 'Household' cavalry, called the Royal or Sacred Ile in a campaign in 219 BC. This small number of native horse was then supplemented by mercenary cavalry.

In Ptolemaic Egypt, the cavalry forces were led by a hipparchos, who commanded a hipparchia. The hipparchiai were divided into ilai, then into lochoi and then into dekades (sing. dekas, a file of 10 men). Hipparchiai fall into two categories. There were five known hipparchiai in the 3rd century, of which the 4th and 5th are known to have been in existence in the 2nd century BC. Other than these, there were four hipparchiai of lower status known by 'ethnic' names; the Thessalians, Thracians, Mysians and Persians. These probably were not actual cavalry troops from those ethnic groups, but more like the Tarantine cavalry mercenaries who did not need to be from Taras to be called thus.

The Seleucid Empire's cavalry were placed in units of oulamoi and then into divisions of ilai. Other than the usual auxiliary, citizen and militia cavalry units, the main elite cavalry units of the Seleucids were the Agema and the Hetairoi ("Companions"). The Hetairoi were the standing elite cavalry unit of the Seleucid army, serving both in peace and war. The Agema was recruited from the Medes and their neighbours, although after the Parthian conquest of Media they were probably recruited from Macedonian settlers. The Hetairoi would escort the king into battle or both the Hetairoi and Agema would escort the king under direct command. Amongst these units were the various grades of 'Kings Friends' or Basilikoi Philoi, who made up other elite cavalry units similar to the Companions.

==== Cavalry tactics ====
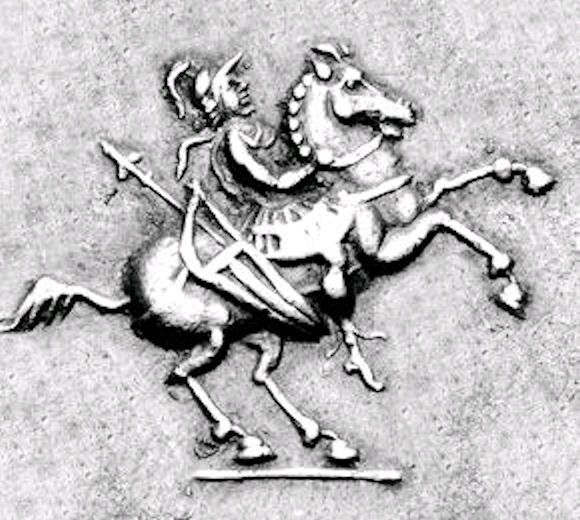
King Hippostratos riding a horse, c. 100 BC (coin detail).

Hellenistic cavalry is much more diverse than the Greek cavalry of earlier eras. Greek tactical manuals categorize them as cataphracts (fully armored, a type of cavalry not to be confused with the Seleucid, Parthian or Byzantine cataphracts) and aphracts (unarmored). Cataphracts was a term commonly employed to describe fully armored cavalry of various weights, with or without shield (usually a thureos), usually armed with a lance. Unarmored cavalry was classified as lancers, javelineers and bowmen. Lancers (xystophoroi or doratophoroi) charged the enemy in dense formations. Javelineers were also called Tarentines and attacked the enemy from afar. Afterwards, they would charge the enemy with lances or keep their distance, in which case they were called light cavalry and/or Tarentines proper. A further category of light cavalry was that of the mounted bowmen, which were collectively called Scythians. These are broad categories, as attested by both Aelian and Asclepiodotus. Arrian's categorization is also very similar.

Most cavalry units of the Hellenistic era were moderately armored and would be armed with javelins or/and lances. Cataphracts were introduced to the Hellenistic world by the Seleucids in the late 3rd century BC and are attested to have also been used, probably as a lighter version and for a very limited time, by the Kingdom of Pergamon. Antiochus III was able to field an extraordinary 6,000 men at Magnesia, the first testimony of cavalry gaining victory over the closed ordered ranks of a competent infantry, yet to no avail. The Seleucids also had moderate access to horse archers from their eastern borders, although they never fielded them in large numbers. The Ptolemies also deployed heavy armored lancers, never cataphracts, probably because of the high temperatures prevalent in their empire. In Macedonia, armored lancers were also deployed, after the tradition of Alexander's Hetairoi, yet their capability could not compare to that of their predecessors. In the rest of the Greek world, cavalry maintained its traditional equipment of javelin and short lance. Apart from the cavalry types used by the Greeks, the Hellenistic kingdoms also used cavalry from subordinate and allied barbarian states, which varied in quality, armor and equipment. Mercenary cavalry troops were also employed, including Thracians, Armenians, and even Berbers from North Africa.

No cavalry formation is unfortunately mentioned in the existent descriptions of cavalry battles, but all ancient Greek tactical manuals, including Asclepiodotus' Techne Taktike written in the 1st century BC, clearly and in detail describe the wedge and the rhombus formations, stating that they were in use at least at the time of their compilation as well as the more common square and rectangular formations. Thus, we have to accept the probability that they were used throughout the Hellenistic era. Other formations attested and probably used were the Tarantenic circle, employed by the Tarentines proper and the Scythian formation, attested in use by the Scythian horse archers. Both were skirmishing formations and facilitated continuous harassment while at the same time providing the required mobility to avoid enemy charges.

Although, throughout the Hellenistic era, more importance was usually given to the role of the infantry than to cavalry, most major battles of the era were gained because of good or bad cavalry performance. Antigonus was defeated at Ipsus, because his victorious cavalry failed to return from the pursuit before the 400 enemy elephants effectively blocked its way back. Antiochus was defeated at Raphia, when, engaging in pursue of the defeated enemy cavalry, he failed to return and charge the enemy phalanx. At the Battle of Cynoscephalae, the Aetolian cavalry played a key role in the battle and at Pydna, the Macedonian lancers suddenly left the battlefield allowing the Romans to surround and massacre Perseus' phalanx. At Magnesia, the cataphracts routed the Roman legions but it was Eumenes' cavalry that turned the tide and effectively ensured victory for the Romans. In Sellasia, it was Philopoemen's cavalry that conquered Oida, earning the admiration of Antigonus Doson.

==== Heavy cavalry ====
A modern conception, there is no mentioning of a "heavy cavalry" in the Greek military manuals. Unfortunately, even today, we don't have a concrete notion of what "heavy cavalry" should be. According to one school of thought, it is any cavalry capable of shock action against the enemy line, according to another, it should just be heavily armored. According to the Greeks, we have to define it as any cavalry that was not considered "light", that is, which was not purely skirmishing. Another aspect of the cavalry of the ancient era we have to keep in mind is the unwillingness to use even the best trained and heaviest of cavalries against any dense mass of able infantry. This is evident in many ancient descriptions of battles. According to Arrian, when Alexander faced the Indian tribe of the Malli, he did not dare assault them with his, by now, veteran Heteroi or Thessalians, but he followed the customary cavalry tactics of attacks and retreats (perispasmoi).

Thus, most cavalry types of the Hellenistic armies can be considered heavy, regardless of their armor, as long as they are equipped with lances and act in dense formations. Traditional Greek cavalry was usually employed to cover a retreat or pursue a retreating enemy. A cavalry engagement usually involved a lengthy exchange of javelins; close combat was avoided. The Macedonian Hetairoi (Companions; Companion Cavalry) may have been the first true, able shock cavalry, armed with long lances and heavy armor. Their tradition was carried on in the Hellenistic times and troops similarly armed were called doratophoroi or xystophoroi (both terms translated as lance bearers or plainly lancers). The term Hetairoi was reserved for units comprising men of aristocratic blood. These doratophoroi were primarily used against enemy cavalry; their use against densely deployed infantry was very limited. Their extreme version were the cataphracts of the Seleucid cavalry. The various Agemata (pl. of Agema), usually the elite bodyguards of the Hellenistic Kings, were similarly armed.

==== Cataphracts ====
Cataphracts were heavily armed and armoured cavalrymen. The Cataphract (Kataphraktoi) were first introduced into the Hellenistic military tradition with the Seleucid Antiochus III the Great's anabasis in the east from 212-205 BC. With his campaigns in Parthia and Bactria, he came into contact with Cataphracts and copied them. Most of the Seleucid heavy cavalry after this period were armed in this manner, despite keeping their original unit names. The Cataphract generally only served in the eastern Hellenistic armies.

Both man and horse were entirely encased in armour—in the form of scale or banded segments sewn onto a fabric. Riders' faces were covered in seamless metal helmets. The weight carried by the horse was excessive, and prolonged charges were out of the question. Instead, cataphracts trotted to within a reasonable distance before charging, exerting energy only during the decisive engagement. Once in combat, the cataphract and his steed enjoyed superb protection from attacks thanks to their armour. However, stamina, endurance and heat were always concerns in extended combat.

The standard cataphract weapon was a xyston-like spear. For close-quarter combat, a mace or sword was made available as a secondary weapon. The mace and cataphract ideas were combined into the Sassanid-introduced and Roman-named Clibanarii, who were armoured, both man and beast, in chainmail, and armed with a mace.

Besides the Seleucids it is possible that also the Kingdom of Pergamon adopted some cataphracts. Pergamese reliefs show cavalry similarly armed and equipped as Seleucid cataphracts, indicating an adoption. Yet these were probably equipped from trophies taken from the Seleucids, which would suggest limited numbers.

==== Light horse archers ====
The writings of historians, from Arrian to Appian, detail numerous tribes, nations, and ethnic groups—Dahae, Mysians, Scythians, etc.—from whom Hellenistic rulers recruited such warriors.

==== Tarantine cavalry ====
Originally the cavalry of the army of the Greek city of Tarantas (Tarentum) in Magna Graecia, it was renowned for its peculiar battle tactics. It was the only cavalry of the Graeco-Roman world to employ pure, advanced skirmishing tactics. It was unarmored and normally equipped with a shield and javelins, which it hurled at the enemy, evading any attempt to engage in close combat. In the Hellenistic era, we have numerous references to Tarantine units, even in the armies of the eastern Macedonian empires, but unfortunately no definite account of their equipment or their tactical use. From the Greek tactical manuals we learn that Tarantines is the collective name of the lightly armored cavalry, which was equipped with javelins and lance, that first skirmishes with the enemy and then charges. Cavalry that avoided using the charge, preferring to remain at a distance and skirmish, was called Tarantines proper. From these texts, we can safely deduce that, during Hellenistic times, the term "Tarantines" no longer bore a geographical significance and was used purely as a tactical term.

=== Special units ===
==== Chariots ====
War chariots were rarely used during the Hellenistic era. Their value against any opponent or commander of notable skill was very low as was already proven by the Ten Thousand (the Greek mercenaries with whom Xenophon served) at Cunaxa and Alexander in Arbela. Their use is considered more harmful than beneficial in the Greek tactical manuals, yet they could have a frightening effect on badly trained, inexperienced opponents, such as Asiatic tribal armies. The idea that the Romans had no previous experience in fighting chariots might be the reason why Antiochus III used them against the Roman army, with disastrous results for his own army. Appian suggests that wounding the horses drawing a war chariot can cast the formation in disorder, because an out-of-control chariot forces other chariots to engage in evading maneuvers to avoid being hit by its scythes. Archelaus also used them against Sulla in the battle of Chaeronea, again to no avail.

==== War Elephants ====
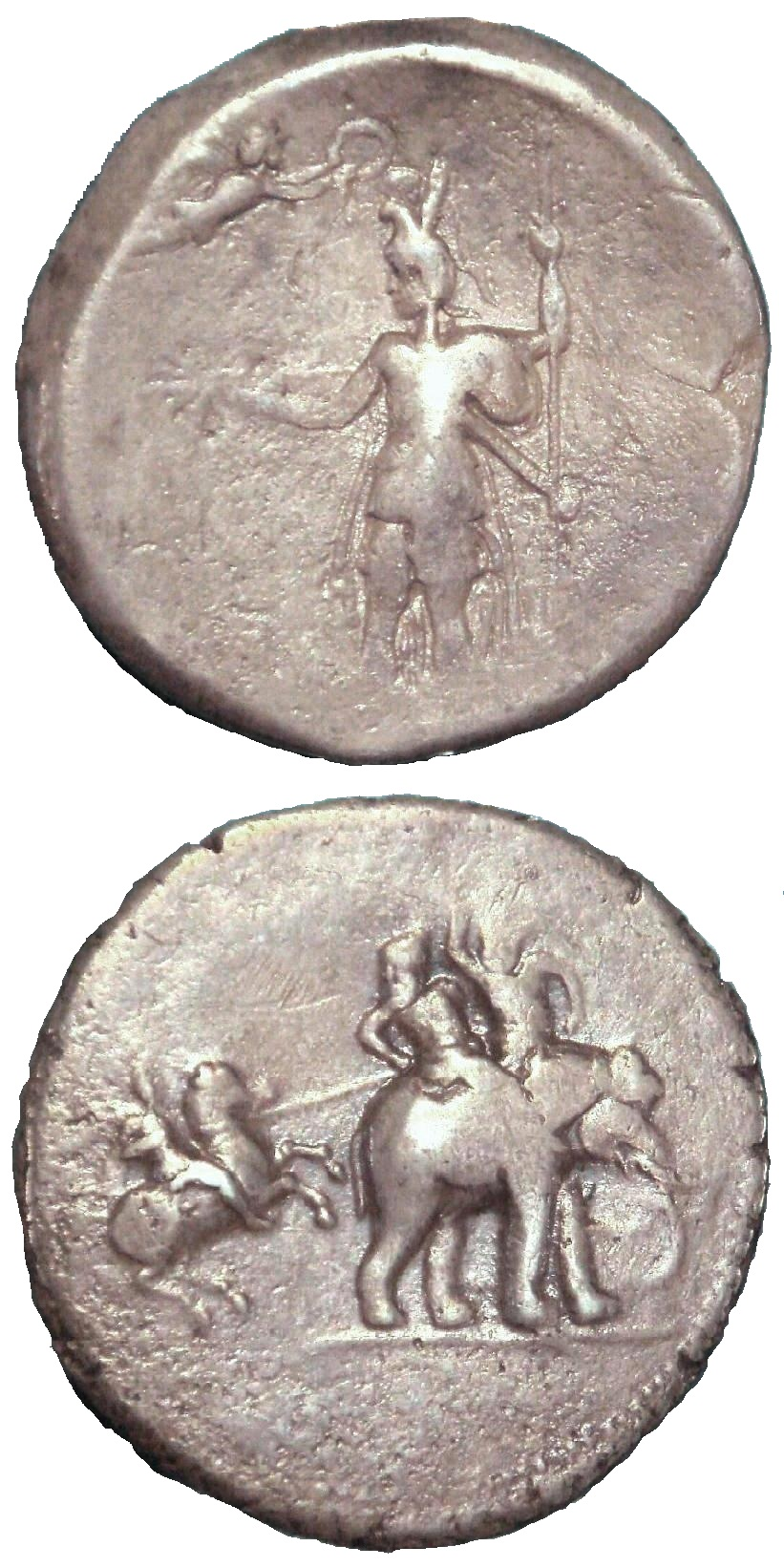
"Victory coin" of Alexander the Great, minted in Babylon c. 322 BC, following his campaigns in the Indian subcontinent. Obv: Alexander being crowned by Nike. Rev: Alexander attacking king Porus on his elephant. Silver. British Museum.

War elephants were considered unreliable by Greek military writers and thinkers, but played an important role in many battles of the Hellenistic era, especially in the east. As was proven many times before, as well as in the wars of Pyrrhus of Epirus and Hannibal, elephants could throw a competent enemy battle line into confusion and win the day, as long as the enemy was not accustomed to battle against them. But, if used for a frontal assault, the danger of them panicking and charging into the lines of their own army was great. As Livy attested, elephants were more dangerous when scared than when controlled. The Hellenistic generals were well aware of this fact and thus did not deploy them before or among their battle line, as was the case in Hydaspes or in Zama, both examples of how routing elephants could cost the battle. Instead, they were deployed on the wings, where they could keep the enemy cavalry at bay, protecting the infantry from a cavalry outflank. Against them, the enemy would use his own elephants, a necessity, since cavalry would never be able to conquer them. There, should they be defeated, they would have space to retreat without getting in the way of the infantry. Elephants would sometimes be accompanied by irregular infantry battalions, which would assist in the elephantomachia (elephant battle), while at the same time protecting their side from enemy infantry.

A peculiar use of the elephants is attested during the Battle of Ipsus, where Seleucus Nicator posted his elephants in a long line between the battlefield and the victorious cavalry of Demetrius, effectively keeping him away and gaining victory. This incident might be the best attestation to the unwillingness of horses to approach an elephant.

War elephants were typically fitted with a tower on their back that housed several soldiers armed with sarissae and projectiles (arrows or javelins) to unload on the enemy. The rider (mahout) sat across the neck and guided the elephant into battle. Armour too, was sometimes wrapped around the elephants to protect them and increase the natural defense offered by the thickness of their hides. The size of the tower would be proportionate to the size of the elephants, the Asiatic being considerably larger than the North African elephants used by the Ptolemies. Polybius gives a valuable account of an elephant battle between these two species in his description of the battle of Raphia, where the beasts of Antiochus easily routed their African counterparts, yet the King failed to claim victory, since Ptolemy's phalanx forced his center into a disorderly retreat.

==== Artillery ====
Artillery was also used in the Hellenistic era, albeit rarely and without much effect. Catapults and other heavy artillery had a short range, which meant they would have to be up close to the enemy to make an impact. However, this made them vulnerable, indeed 'the difficulty of getting catapults quickly into, and out of, action might make them more of a liability than an asset in fluid warfare'. Machanidas of Sparta learnt this the hard way when his artillery at the battle of Mantinea in 207 BC was quickly taken by Philopoemen's Achaean infantry. Philip V of Macedon used artillery, in conjunction with defensive field works, in his defence of the Aous Valley in the Second Macedonian War, inflicting high casualties on the Roman side. Antiochus the Great is attested to have used it at Thermopylae, resting it in imposing positions over the prospected battlefield. Perseus of Macedon used artillery in the Third Macedonian War to defend the Elpeus river from Aemilius Paulus, who did indeed move away to seek another route around this defensive line. It was also used in fortified towns to harass enemy assailants. Its use in the battlefield does not seem to have been important, as mass use is not attested until much later, as Arrian clearly suggests in his "Array against the Alans".

==== Dromedaries ====
Camels are attested in use in the Seleucid army at the battle of Magnesia, but their small number (500) suggests they were not a regular addition. According to Xenophon, their scent scared off horses, but this effect must not have been especially notable or more writers would have commented on this.

== Battle arrays ==
The phalanx would be formed in the center, charging the enemy in pursuit of a swift victory. Its flanks would be protected by units of infantry, which ideally would be more trustworthy in case of disorder. Cavalry and elephants would be arrayed on the wings to counter those of the enemy. Light infantry would be deployed in front of the phalanx in an effort to throw the enemy line into confusion. Then they would run to the wings to assist in the cavalry and elephant battles.

Deviations from the norm existed when the circumstances called for a different plan. Pyrrhus countered the Roman legions by using a mixed phalanx formation of pikemen, spearmen and elephants, an array that proved successful in all battles against them, regardless of his "more than average" losses. A most competent tactician indeed, his decisions were influenced by the composition of his army, which included many untrustworthy troops from Magna Graecia. The battle of Sellasia was also peculiar, in reality being more of an assault against a static enemy, a fact that enabled Antigonus to effectively launch a series of separate attacks.

== Siege warfare ==
In the Hellenistic period, development in science was incredibly noteworthy and that could not but reflect on siegecraft: Archimedes developed machines that terrified the Roman assailants of Syracuse; while Demetrius Poliorcetes was notorious for the incredible size of the siege machines employed in his exploits, especially against the city of Rhodes. Yet, most sieges employed more traditional methods, relying on speed, surprise and traitors rather than lengthy preparations and a comprehensive barrage. Livius is very descriptive regarding the harassing manner of military campaigns, a complicated game of continuous attacks, movement of forces and constant patrols.

== Militaries ==
- Antigonid Macedonian army
- Pyrrhic army
- Lysimachid army
- Greco-Bactrian military
- Pergamene army
- Pontic army
- Ptolemaic army
- Ptolemaic navy
- Seleucid army
- Achaean League army
- Aetolian League army
- Spartan army
- Athenian navy
- Rhodian navy

=== Units and formation ===
- Companion cavalry
- Hoplite
- Macedonian phalanx
- Pezhetairoi
- Phalanx

=== Figure ===
- Aelianus Tacticus

=== Rank ===
- Chiliarch

=== Weapon ===
- Sarissa
- Xyston

== Major wars ==
- Wars of the Diadochi
- Pyrrhic War
- Syrian Wars
- Macedonian Wars
- Mithridatic Wars

== Major battles ==
- Battle of the Hellespont (321 BC)
- Battle of Gabiene
- Battle of Gaza
- Siege of Rhodes (305–304 BC)
- Battle of Ipsus
- Battle of Heraclea
- Battle of Asculum
- Battle of Thermopylae (279 BC)
- Battle of Lysimachia
- Battle of Eryx
- Battle of Beneventum
- Battle of the Aous (274 BC)
- Siege of Sparta
- Battle of the Bagradas River (255 BC)
- Battle of the Caecus River
- Battle of Sellasia
- Battle of Raphia
- First Battle of Lamia
- Battle of the Arius
- Siege of Bactra
- Battle of Mantinea
- Battle of Panium
- Battle of the Aous (198 BC)
- Battle of Cynoscephalae
- Battle of Thermopylae (191 BC)
- Battle of Magnesia
- Battle of Callinicus
- Battle of Pydna
- Battle of Halys
