= Pierre Courcelle =

French historian (1912–1980)

Pierre Courcelle FBA OMRI
- Born: March 16, 1912
- Died: 25 July 1980 (aged 68)
- Awards: American Philosophical Society (1968)

Academic background
- Education: École normale supérieure École Nationale des Chartes

Academic work
- Institutions: University of Paris

Pierre Paul Courcelle (16 March 1912 – 25 July 1980) was a French historian who was a specialist of ancient philosophy and of Latin Patristics, especially of St Augustine. He was elected to the American Philosophical Society in 1968.

== Family ==
Pierre Courcelle, the youngest of three siblings, was born in 1912 in Orléans. His father, the merchant Paul Courcelles, and his mother, Madeleine née Giroux, were divorced before his birth, by a legal judgment on December 20, 1911. Pierre Courcelle's origins were from Orléans on both the maternal and paternal side. While he was still a high school student, he had, according to his own testimony, done extensive genealogical research concerning his ancestors back to the 16th century, but found aucun homme illustre, rien que des laboureurs (no illustrious man, only peasant farmers).

In 1937, he married Jeanne Ladmirant (1909–1999), doctor in history and archeology from the University of Liège. They had known each other while he was at the École française de Rome and she at the Académie de Belgique à Rome. She was his constant collaborator, especially in the preparation and writing of several works in which iconographic research plays a large role. They had eight children.

== Career ==
Pierre Courcelle did his primary and secondary studies at the Lycée d'Orléans. In 1927, he was a laureate of the nationwide competition Concours general in compositions written in Latin. He prepared at the Lycée Louis-le-Grand for the École normale supérieure de la rue d'Ulm, where he matriculated in 1930 at the age of 18 . The same year, he passed the competition for the École nationale des chartes, where he came first. Exceptionally, he completed two academic majors in parallel, obtaining a double major in, on one hand, philology and history of literature, and, on the other hand, archival expertise and history. In 1934, he was appointed professor agrégé of classical Greek and Latin literature, as well as archivist-paleographer, at the École française de Rome, where he remained until 1936 .

After his year of military service, he was from 1937 to 1939 deputy director of the Institut français de Naples ( which was founded in 1919 in Naples to establish closer cultural relations between France and Italy's Mezzogiorno). Mobilized in 1939 as an infantry lieutenant, he received two citations and the Croix de Guerre. In 1940–1941, he was a teacher at the Lycée d'Orléans. But in 1941, he was appointed lecturer at the Faculty of Arts in Bordeaux. In 1943, he defended his doctoral thesis on Les Lettres grecques en Occident de Macrobe à Cassiodore (The Greek literature in the West from Macrobius to Cassiodorus). The following year, at the age of 32, he became both a professor at (what is now called) Sorbonne Université (where he succeeded Pierre de Labriolle) and director of studies at the École Pratique des Hautes Etudes (4th section). From 1946 to 1962, he was also a lecturer at the École normale supérieure de jeunes filles in Sèvres.

In 1952, succeeding Alfred Ernout as professor at the Collège de France, he held the chair of Latin literature, while remaining director of studies at the École des Hautes Etudes. He exercised these two functions until his death in 1980. From 1978 to his death, he was also director of the Fondation Thiers (which is now sponsored by the Institut de France and associated with the library Fondation Dosne-Thiers).

== Selected publications ==
- Les Lettres grecques en Occident de Macrobe à Cassiodore, Paris, de Boccard, 1943; 2^{e} éd., 1948 (thèse). LCCN 50-25329
  - Courcelle, Pierre (1969). Late Latin Writers and their Greek Sources. Cambridge, Massachusetts: Harvard University Press; translation of 2nd edition of Les Lettres grecques en Occident de Macrobe à Cassiodore by Harry E. Wedeck; xii+467 pages LCCN 69-12721
- Histoire littéraire des grandes invasions germaniques, Paris, Hachette, 1948, 264 p. LCCN 49-24506; 3^{e} éd., Paris, Études augustiniennes, 1964, 436 p., ill.
- Recherches sur les Confessions de saint Augustin, Paris, E. de Boccard, 1950; Nouvelle édition augmentée et illustrée, Paris, E. de Boccard, 1968, 615 p., ill. LCCN 68-139482
- L'Entretien de Pascal et Sacy : ses sources et ses énigmes (Coll. « Bibliothèque des textes philosophiques »), Paris, J. Vrin, 1960, 83 p. (réédité en 1981).
- Les Confessions de saint Augustin dans la tradition littéraire : antécédents et postérité, Paris, Études augustiniennes, 1963, 746 p., ill. LCCN 66-33983
- Vita Sancti Augustini imaginibus adornata. Manuscrit de Boston, Public Library, n° 1483, S. XV, inédit (en collaboration avec Jeanne Courcelle), Paris, Études augustiniennes, 1963, 257 p., ill.
- Iconographie de saint Augustin (en collaboration avec Jeanne Courcelle), 5 vol., ill., Paris, Études augustiniennes (vol. 1 : Les Cycles du xiv^{e} siècle, 1965, 253 p.; vol. 2 : Les Cycles du xv^{e} siècle, 1969, 369 p.; vol. 3 : Les cycles du XVI^{e} et XVII^{e} siècle, 1972, 372 p.; vol. 4 : Les cycles du xviii^{e} siècle. 1.– L'Allemagne, 1980, 217 p.; vol. 5 : Les cycles du XVII^{e} (2^{e} partie) et XVIII^{e} siècle, 1991, 206 p.).
- La Consolation de philosophie dans la tradition littéraire : antécédents et postérité de Boèce, Paris, 1967 (développement de sa thèse de l'École des chartes).
- Recherches sur saint Ambroise : « Vies » anciennes, culture, iconographie, Paris, Études augustiniennes, 1973, 369 p., ill. en noir et en coul.
- Huit rôles des tailles inédits de Sully-sur-Loire : 1440-1484 (« Mémoires de l'Académie des inscriptions et belles-lettres », 45), Paris, Imprimerie nationale - C. Klincksieck, 1973, 61 p.
- « Connais-toi toi-même » de Socrate à saint Bernard, 3 vol., Paris, Études augustiniennes, 1974–1975.
- Nouveaux documents inédits de Sully-sur-Loire : 1364-1500 (« Mémoires de l'Académie des inscriptions et belles-lettres », nouvelle série, 3), Paris, Imprimerie nationale - C. Klincksieck, 1978, 85 p.
- Opuscula selecta. Bibliographie et recueil d’articles publiés entre 1938 et 1980, 1984.
- Saint Ortaire : sa vie, son culte, son iconographie (en collab. avec Jean Fournée), Société parisienne d'histoire et d'archéologie normandes, 1989, 52 p. ISBN 2-901488-36-6
- Lecteurs païens et lecteurs chrétiens de l’Énéide (coll. « Mémoires de l'Académie des inscriptions et belles-lettres », nouvelle série, 4), Paris, Gauthier-Villars - diffusion De Boccard, 1984, 2 vol. (vol. 1 : Les Témoignages littéraires, 759 p.; vol. 2 : Les Manuscrits illustrés de l’Énéide du x^{e} xv^{e} siècle (avec la collab. de Jeanne Courcelle), 265 p. et 169 p. de pl. en noir et en coul.). Ouvrage posthume.

== See also ==
- Copanello
