= Greek Empire =

Greek Empire most commonly refers to one of the following two empires:

- Macedonian Empire of Alexander the Great
- Byzantine Empire

It may also refer to one of the following Ancient Greek or Hellenistic entities:

- Athenian Empire
- Spartan hegemony
- Theban hegemony
- Macedonian hegemony under Philip II
- Ptolemaic Empire
- Seleucid Empire
- Antigonid empire
- Lysimachian Empire
- Pyrrhic Empire
- Greco-Bactrian kingdom
- Indo-Greek kingdom
- Kingdom of Pontus under Mithridates VI

It may also refer to one of the following Byzantine entities:

- Empire of Nicaea
- Despotate of Epirus
  - Empire of Thessalonica
- Empire of Trebizond

== See also ==
- Archaic Greece
- Magna Graecia
- Classical Greece
- Hellenistic armies
