= Rhombus formation =

Type of cavalry formation

A rhombus is a cavalry formation in which troops are arrayed to form a rhombus-shaped body.

== The rhombus in antiquity ==
Cavalry in rhombus formation has superior maneuverability, being able to rapidly change its direction by alternating leaders posted at its four points. It is the customary formation of the famed Thessalian cavalry and according to Arrian, it was invented by the Thessalian Iason (Jason). Aelian argues that its origins are even more ancient and gives as its inventor the Thessalian Ilon, from whom, he adds, the word "ile" (Greek for cavalry squadron) derives. Asclepiodotus also praises the formation's maneuverability.

According to Asclepiodotus, the Thessalians placed their best men on the sides and the very best of these at the angles. The man at the fore angle was called an ilarches (Greek: ιλάρχης), the one at the rear angle an ouragos (Greek: ουραγός) and those on the right and left angles plagiofylakes (Greek: πλαγιοφύλακες).

There are two ways to form a rhombus, one is by rank and the other by file. The first is formed with each subsequent rank containing one more trooper up to the middle rank, one less from then on. Thus, the first rank is occupied by the ilarches, the second by two men, the third by three and so on. In this type of rhombus, there are no files, as each subsequent rank is arrayed with its men in the intervals between the men in front. The rhombus by file is formed with each subsequent rank containing two more troopers, so the men are posted in files, the first rank being occupied by the ilarches, the second by three men, the third by five and so on.
