= Éros Adolescent =

1980 book by Félix Buffière

- Author: Félix Buffière
- Publisher: Les Belles Lettres
- Publication date: 1980
- Pages: 704
- ISBN: 978-2251325842

Éros Adolescent: Pédérastie dans la Grèce Antique is a book about pederasty in ancient Greece written by French classicist Félix Buffière. It was published by Les Belles Lettres in 1980.
