= Les Belles Lettres =

- Founded: 1919
- Founder: Association Guillaume Budé
- Country of origin: France
- Headquarters location: Paris
- Publication types: Books
- Nonfiction topics: Classics
- Official website: www.lesbelleslettres.com

Les Belles Lettres, founded in 1919, is a French publisher specialising in the publication of ancient texts such as the Collection Budé.

The publishing house, originally named Société Les Belles Lettres pour le développement de la culture classique, was founded by the Association Guillaume Budé, with the initial goal of publishing Greek and Latin classics.

The publishing house won the PhiloMonaco Mention Honorifique in 2019.

== History ==
=== Foundation ===
According to the usual story, the history of Belles Lettres began in World War I when the linguist Joseph Vendryes wanted a critical edition of Homer to include in his field pack, but could find only German editions.

At the end of the war, the Association Guillaume Budé was created, named for the 16th-century French humanist. The association began with the mission of increasing the availability of the great classics of Greek and Latin culture and decided to publish "a comprehensive collection of Greek and Latin authors, [both] texts and translations".

However, the association did not have the necessary funds. The société Les Belles Lettres pour le développement de la culture classique was therefore founded as its publishing company; this has since become the société d’édition Les Belles Lettres. Capital was raised from "French industrialist friends of the Classics", with a total of 300 shareholders. The first president was the Hellenist Paul Mazon, a translator of Homer. The company had its offices at 157 Boulevard Saint-Germain in Paris.

After Jean Malye became president of the Belles Lettres, he moved its headquarters to 95 Boulevard Raspail, where they remain. The company currently publishes approximately 100 titles annually.

=== Distribution company ===
In 2004, Les Belles Lettres founded a SAS called Belles Lettres Diffusion Distribution (BLDD), through which it distributes books by other publishers.

=== Fire ===
On 29 May 2002, a fire destroyed the Belles Lettres warehouse in Gasny (Eure). More than three million books were burnt. A reprinting programme was immediately launched, which has enabled corrections and bibliographic additions.

== Collections ==
=== Collection des universités de France (Collection Budé) ===
The two first volumes of the Collection des universités de France, bilingual editions of Greek and Latin classics commonly known simply as Budé after the association, were published in 1920: in the Greek series, the Hippias Minor of Plato, translated by Maurice Croiset, with a yellow cover and the logo of an aryballos in the form of an owl, representing Athena's owl, and shortly afterwards in the Latin series, the De rerum natura of Lucretius, translated by Alfred Ernout, with a red cover and the logo of the Capitoline Wolf. The one hundredth book was published in 1931.

Fulfilling Vendryes' original wish, the Collection des universités de France publishes scholarly editions in a pocket-sized format. The original (with critical apparatus) and the French (with footnotes) are on facing pages, right and left respectively. There is a substantial introduction. The text is intended to be based on the oldest version that can be reconstructed from the surviving manuscripts, for which microfilms are used, and the translation "above all to reproduce the movement, color, the tone of the text". Editing and translation are assigned to one or more scholars who are specialists in the author concerned and are subject to careful verification by a third expert. A statement of responsibility appears on the reverse of the title page: "In accordance with the statutes of the Association Guillaume Budé, this volume has been submitted for approval by the technical commission, which has instructed [name] to revise it and oversee its correction in collaboration with [name]." The volumes are paperbacks, still in the original 13 by 20 centimetres (5.1 in × 7.9 in) size, printed on 80-gram (2.8 oz) cream wove manufactured especially for the publisher. They were originally sewn but since 1976 have been bound and cropped.

As of 2011, the two series include more than 800 volumes (a few more Greek than Latin). The current goal of the collection is "to publish everything written in Greek and Latin before the reign of the Emperor Justinian (in the 6th century)". However, Christian writers, although originally fully within the intended range of publications, editorial beginning, are largely left to the Sources chrétiennes collection of Éditions du Cerf. Only the literary writings of the Church Fathers, such as the Confessions of Saint Augustine, have been or will be published in the Collection des universités de France.

Since 2006, some of the Latin and Greek works have been reprinted without the critical apparatus in the series Classiques en poche (pocket classics) headed by Hélène Monsacré, with updated translations and where applicable revised texts, for example the translation by Olivier Sers of Petronius' Satyricon.

=== Les Belles Lettres English (Classical Wisdom Weekly) ===
In 2012, Les Belles Lettres English was established in order to create an English newsletter and website called Classical Wisdom Weekly. The website launched on 6 November 2012 and is dedicated to promoting and teaching Ancient Greek and Latin literature. The tagline for Classical Wisdom Weekly is "Ancient Wisdom for Modern Minds".

=== Other collections ===
There are also bilingual collections on the history of France, classic medieval texts and classics of English literature (including a bilingual edition of the complete works of Shakespeare) and Chinese Literature. In addition, the company publishes older French authors such as François de Malherbe.

- Confluents psychanalytiques, launched in 1976.
- Realia, headed by Jean-Noël Robert and launched in 1983, includes his Les Plaisirs à Rome.
- Bibliothèque chinoise (漢文法譯書庫), headed by Anne Cheng, Marc Kalinowski and Stephane Feuillas, and launched in 2010.
- Histoire features works by French historians such as Pierre Vidal-Naquet and numerous translations of foreign works.
- Science et Humanisme includes editions and translations of scientific texts of the Renaissance and the Age of Reason, by authors including Galileo, Johannes Kepler, Campanella and Sir Isaac Newton.
- La Roue à livres consists of translations of works by ancient and Renaissance authors, but without the original text.
- L’âne d’or features works from the history of ideas, in particular Immanuel Kant, Giordano Bruno, astronomy, and the history of medicine.
- Classiques du Nord, headed by Régis Boyer, publishes translations of Danish, Swedish, Norwegian and Icelandic literature.
- Guides Belles Lettres des civilisations covers periods and places including pre-Columbian America, Viking Iceland, and Brahmin India.
- Laissez faire, headed by François Guillaumat, and Bibliothèque classique de la liberté, headed by Alain Laurent, publish liberal authors such as Frederic Bastiat, Yves Guyot and Benjamin Constant.

Les Belles Lettres has also published outside its collections bilingual critical editions of the complete works of Giordano Bruno and of Petrarch, and less known writers including Jean-Edern Hallier, Philippe Leotard and Francis Lalanne.

=== Other work ===
- Éros Adolescent: Pédérastie dans la Grèce Antique is a book about pederasty in ancient Greece written by French classicist Félix Buffière.
