= Asclepiodotus (philosopher) =

Greek writer and philosopher, author of 'Tactics'

Asclepiodotus Tacticus (Ancient Greek: Ἀσκληπιόδοτος Τακτικός, romanized: Asklēpiódotos Taktikós; fl. 1st century BC), also known as Asclepiodotus, was a Greek writer and philosopher known for Tactics, a short treatise on military tactics. His work is an important source for understanding the military practices of the Hellenistic period.

== Life ==
Little is known about the life of Asclepiodiotus. The Greek manuscripts read “(of) Asclepiodotus the Philosopher” (Ἀσκληπιοδότου φιλοσόφου) and he has been identified with the Asclepiodotus mentioned by Seneca in his Naturales quaestiones. Seneca quotes Asclepiodotus on matters of natural history and also reports that he was a student of Posidonius, who, as mentioned by Aelianus Tacticus, also wrote a treatise on military tactics. If Asclepiodotus was indeed the student of Posidonius, he would likely have been born in the late 2nd century or 1st century BCE and probably studied in Rhodes, where Posidonius had a school.

== Works ==
Diagram from Ch. X (The Terms used for Military Evolutions) demonstrating the manoeuvers of the phalanx.

Asclepiodotus' only known work is a treatise in twelve chapters on military tactics and theory (Ἀσκληπιοδότου φιλοσόφου τακτικὰ κεφάλαια, or Tactics). This text was transmitted in the Codex Laurentianus (Plut.55.4) and eleven other manuscripts dependent on it (see below). Along with the text, the manuscripts transmit figures thought to be copies of diagrams by Asclepiodotus' own hand.

The Tactics was a theoretical text that seems to have served no practical use, following a general trend in Hellenistic and Roman texts on warfare, both scientific and tactical. Poznanski, however, stresses the practical, non-theoretical nature of the work, which, among other things, is irreplaceable for our knowledge of the vocabulary on the phalanx and other military terminology of the Hellenistic period.

The treatise focuses on the phalanx, its divisions, and its position, and discusses other topics, such as peltasts and cavalry. Some aspects of warfare discussed in the treatise, such as battle chariots and elephants, were no longer in use in the first century BCE, suggesting that either he used earlier Hellenistic armies as models, or he based his work on an earlier text.

Chapter Titles of the Tactics
I.	The Different Branches of the Army
II.	The Strength and the Names of the Subdivisions of the Hoplite-Phalanx
III.	The Disposition of the Men both in the Entire Army and in its Subdivisions
IV.	The Intervals between the Soldiers
V.	The Appropriate Size and Character of the Arms
VI.	The Phalanx of the Light Infantry and of the Targeteers, and the Disposition and Names of its Subdivisions
VII.	The Phalanx of the Cavalry, and the Names of the Whole Body as well as of its Subdivisions
VIII.	Chariots
IX.	Elephants
X.	The Terms in Common Use for Military Evolutions
XI.	The Various Arrangements of the Divisions of the Army on the March
XII.	The Commands used in Military Evolutions

The style of the text is terse. As Oldfather, et al. describe, "little effort is made to vary the almost inevitable monotony of a treatise on such a subject; the sentences are short and stiff, the language unimaginative … the whole is dry, but most orderly." Items of historical interest are rare, though occasionally preserved, e.g. that the Thessalian cavalry fought in rhomboid formation.

Some materials in the Tactics seem to be derived from Polybius, or earlier textbooks. The relationship between Asclepiodotus' treatise on military tactics and Posidonius' treatise on the same subject is unclear. Kai Brodersen argues that Posidonius' text was either directly or indirectly a template for Asclepiodotus' text and also for Aelianus Tacticus' On Tactical Arrays of the Greeks (Περὶ στρατηγικῶν τάξεων Ἑλληνικῶν) and Arrian's Ars tactica (Τἐχνη τακτικἠ). Another theory is that Asclepiodotus' treatise was "the skeleton outline of the lectures delivered by his master [Posidonius]."

Asclepiodotus' Tactics was the main source, at least of the extant texts, for Aelian's On Tactical Arrays of the Greeks. However, when Aelianus Tacticus lists the authors who influenced his work, he does not acknowledge Asclepiodotus. Oldfather. et al. provide two possible explanations. The first is that Aelian did not want to call attention to the extent of his obligation. The second is that Asclepiodotus merely transmitted the text of Posidonius, whom Aelian does acknowledge.

Asclepiodotus also wrote on natural history, some topics of which are preserved by Seneca in his Naturales Quaestiones. These include earthquakes and volcanic eruptions, the nature of winds, and the character of subterranean water.

== Editions of the Tactics ==
- Angelo Mai: Spicilegium Romanum, vol. IV, Rome 1840, pp. 577-581 (Latin; only chapters 1–2, from a very late manuscript)
- Hermann Köchly and Wilhelm Rüstow: Griechische Kriegsschriftsteller, Bd. II, I: Die Taktiker (Asklepiodotos, Aelianus), Leipzig 1855, pp. 130-197 (German; editio princeps; from later manuscripts; the Codex Laurentianus was unknown to Köchly and Rüstow)
- William Oldfather, et al.: Aeneas Tacticus, Asclepiodotus, Onasander (Loeb Classical Library 156), London and Cambridge: Harvard University Press. 1923 (English; from the Codex Laurentianus)
- Lucien Poznanski: Asclépiodote, Traité de tactique (Collection des Universités de France), Paris 1992; Nachdruck 2002 (French; definitive edition)
- Giuseppe Cascarino: Tecnica della falange. In Appendice: “Il Trattato Tactico di Asclepiodoto,” Città del Castello: Il Cerchio, 2011 (Italian)
- Kai Brodersen: Arrianos, Asklepiodotos: Die Kunst der Taktik, Berlin and Boston: De Gruyter, 2017 (German).

== Manuscripts of the Tactics ==
Date	Collection Reference	Folios	Location	Brandini, et al. Reference
mid-10th c. CE	Plut. 55.04	132-142v	Biblioteca Medicea Laurenziana; Florence, Italy	R(III)0996
mid-10th c. CE	Plut. 55.04	132-143*	Biblioteca Medicea Laurenziana; Florence, Italy	
end of 15th - beginning of 16th c. CE	Grec 2522	052-77v	Bibliothèque nationale de France; Paris, France	R(III)0192
16th c. CE	Grec 2447	001-17*	Bibliothèque nationale de France; Paris, France	
16th (2/4) c. CE	Grec 2435	075-85v	Bibliothèque nationale de France; Paris, France	R(III)0192
1652 CE	Supplément grec 0083	073v-90v	Bibliothèque nationale de France; Paris, France	R(III)1913a
17th c. CE	Barb. gr. 256	002v-35v	Biblioteca Apostolica Vaticana; Vatican City	R(III)0800
17th (1/2) c. CE	Voss. gr. Q° 12	01-49	Bibliotheek der Rijksuniversiteit; Leiden, The Netherlands	R(III)1444
17th (1/2) c. CE	Grec 2528	001-7v, 010-18v	Bibliothèque nationale de France; Paris, France	R(III)0192
19th c. CE	Supplément grec 1252	070-84v	Bibliothèque nationale de France; Paris, France	
19th c. CE	fonds principal 3528		Bibliothèque Sainte-Geneviève; Paris, France	
unknown	Allacci 007		Biblioteca Vallicelliana; Rome, Italy	

== References and further reading ==
- Bandini, A.-M., Rostagno, E., Festa, N., Kudlein, F. Catalogus codicum manuscriptorum Bibliothecae Mediceae Laurentianae, t. I-III, Leipzig, 1961.
- Brodersen, K. (Ed.) (2017). Arrianos, Asklepiodotos: Die Kunst der Taktik. Berlin, Boston: De Gruyter. ISBN 978-3-11-056216-3.
- Burckhardt, L. “Asclepiodotus, [2] Military theoretician (1st cent. BC),” Brill's New Pauly. Antiquity volumes edited by: Hubert Cancik and Helmuth Schneider. Brill, 2008. Brill Online.
- Campbell, B. "Asclepiodotus." Oxford Classical Dictionary, 2012.
- Cascarino, G. Tecnica della falange. Città del Castello: Il Cerchio, 2011.
- Chisholm, H., ed. (1911). "Asclepiodotus.” Encyclopædia Britannica (11th ed.), Vol. 2. Cambridge University Press.
- Hanson, V. "The modern historiography of ancient warfare." In P. Sabin, H. Van Wees, & M. Whitby (Eds.), The Cambridge History of Greek and Roman Warfare (pp. 1–21). Cambridge: Cambridge University Press, 2007.
- Köchly, H. and Rüstow, W. Griechische Kriegsschriftsteller, Bd. II I: Die Taktiker (Asklepiodotos, Aelianus), Leipzig: Wilhelm Engelmann,1855.
- Mai, A., Spicilegium Romanum, vol. IV, Rome: Typis Collegi Urbani, 1840.
- Oldfather, W. "Notes on the Text of Asclepiodotus," The American Journal of Philology, 41. no. 2 (1920): 127–146.
- Oldfather, W., et al: Aeneas Tacticus, Asclepiodotus, Onasander (Loeb Classical Library 156), London and Cambridge: Harvard University Press. 1923.
- Sekunda, N. "The Budé Asclepiodotus - Lucien Poznanski (ed., tr.): Asclépiodote, Traité de Tactique, (Association Guillaume Budé) Pp. xxvii 62 (texte double); 47 figs. Paris: Les Belles Lettres, 1992," The Classical Review, 44. no. 1 (1994): 36–37.
