= Collection Budé =

Editorial collection of classical texts

Budé edition of Herodotus 2.69-70, on the hunting of crocodiles. Note the original is printed on the right-hand side (called "page directrice"), not on the left as in the Loeb series

The Collection Budé, or the Collection des Universités de France, is an editorial collection comprising the Greek and Latin classics up to the middle of the 6th century (before Emperor Justinian). It is published by Les Belles Lettres, and is sponsored by the Association Guillaume Budé.

Each title of the series includes an introduction, notes and a critical apparatus, as well as a facing-page French translation, comparable to the Loeb Classical Library in the English-speaking world, but with considerably more detailed introductions, apparatus, and critical or explanatory annotations. Some titles even comprise full-scale commentaries. The Greek authors in the series can be recognized by a yellow cover featuring Athena's little owl, while the Latin ones are recognized by a red one where one finds a she-wolf reminiscent of the Capitoline Wolf. A new series, called "Classiques en poche" and aimed at students, has been added: it reproduces the text and translation of the standard editions, but without the critical apparatus.

The first Budé volume, Plato's Hippias Mineur, was published in 1920. Soon afterwards appeared the first Latin work of the series, namely Lucretius' De rerum natura, edited by Alfred Ernout. More than 800 volumes of the series have been published, with the Greek authors (about 430 vol.) outnumbering the Latin ones (about 370 vol.). Both pagan authors and Church Fathers are included although, for the latter, the Sources Chrétiennes series (Éditions du Cerf, Paris), comprising both Greek and Latin authors, is much more complete.

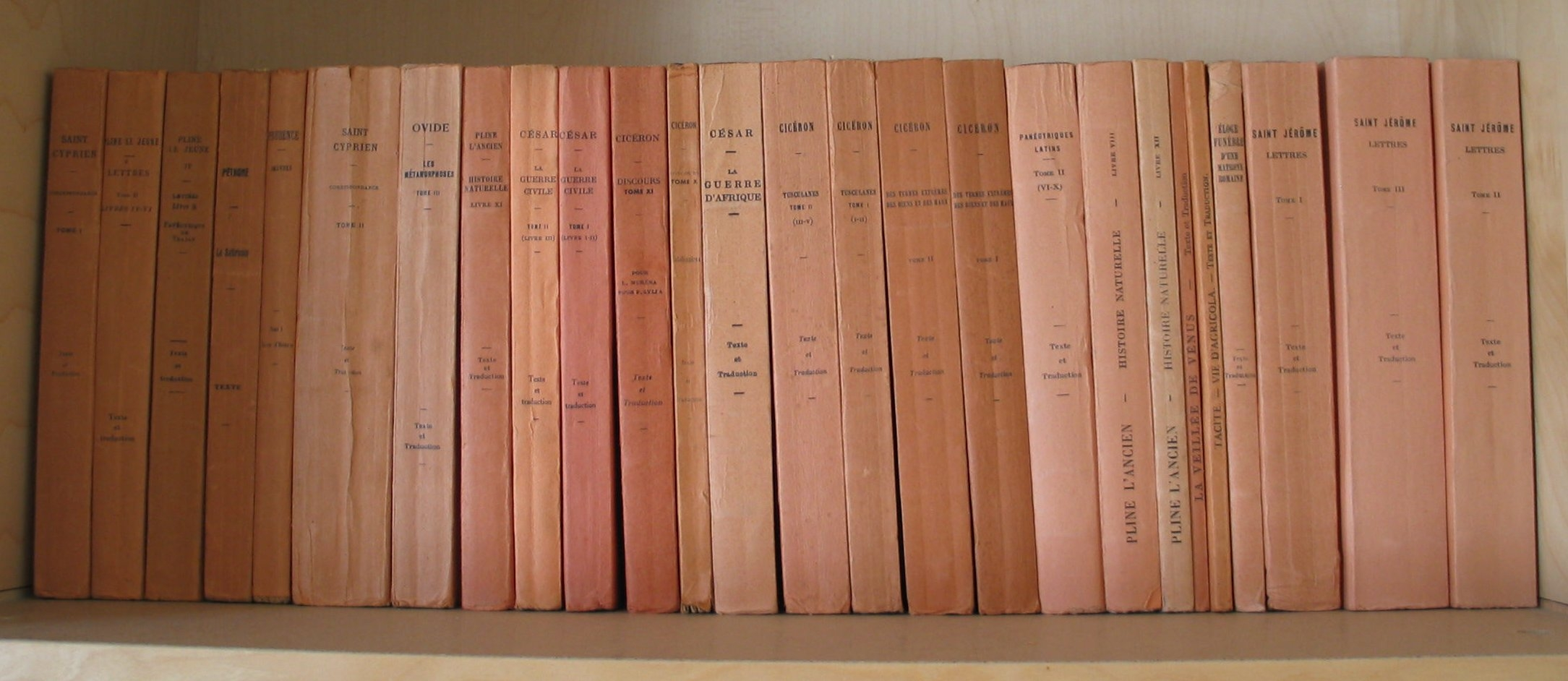
A collection of Latin authors of the Budé series

== See also ==
- Bibliotheca Teubneriana
- Oxford Classical Texts
- Scrittori greci e latini
- Les Belles Lettres
- Éditions Jérôme Millon
