= Association Guillaume Budé =

The Association Guillaume Budé, named after the 16th century humanist Guillaume Budé, is a French cultural and learned society dedicated to the promotion of classical literature.

The society was founded in 1917 by Greek and Latin scholars at the College de France and the Sorbonne University, including the philologists Maurice Croiset, Paul Mazon, Louis Bodin and Alfred Ernout. Its initial goal was to publish critical editions of Greek and Latin classics, competing with Germany which was then leading the field. The result was the Collection Budé, first published in 1920. It soon established a secondary aim of bringing together all those who loved reading classical literature, in the original or in translation.

The society founded its own publishing house Les Belles Lettres, and went beyond the classical world, becoming involved in Byzantine and medieval studies. A bulletin has been published by the society since 1923. Besides publishing, the society organizes conferences, symposia and cultural tours.

Its presidents have included Maurice Croiset (1917-35), Aimé Puech (1835-40), Paul Mazon (1944-1955), Alfred Ernout (1955-1973) and Pierre Chantraine (1974). As of 2025, the president is M. Michel Fartzoff.
