= Harry E. Wedeck =

British classical scholar (1894–1996)

Harry Ezekiel Wedeck (1894 – 8 July 1996) was a British linguist, classical scholar, translator, and writer on the occult, astrology, and aphrodisiacs.

== Biography ==
A native of Sheffield, West Riding of Yorkshire, UK, Wedeck served in India in the British Army during the First World War. He graduated with an M.A. from the University of Edinburgh. He spoke French fluently and studied and travelled in France. Eventually he immigrated to the United States and studied at Teachers College, Columbia University. During the late 1920s he taught Latin at Seward Park High School in Manhattan. For over two decades he taught Latin at Brooklyn's Erasmus Hall High School and from 1935 until (at least) 1950 chaired the high school's department of classical languages. After retirement from Erasmus Hall High School, he taught Greek and Latin classics at Brooklyn College until 1968 and then lectured on medieval studies at The New School for Social Research until 1974.

Wedeck translated novels from French into English and vice versa. He contributed articles to The Saturday Review of Literature and The Classical Journal. Near the end of his teaching career, he produced many books. Several of the books, including Dictionary of Astrology, A Dictionary of Aphrodisiacs, A Treasury of Witchcraft, and Triumph of Satan, remained available in paperback reprints for decades.

Upon his death at the age of 102, he was survived by his widow, Rose Slata Wedeck, two sons, Edmond (1923–2011) and David (1926–2011), and four grandchildren.

== Books and monographs ==
- Humor in Varro, and other essays. Oxford: B. Blackwell. 1929; 112 pages
- Third year Latin, with introduction, notes, vocabulary, and grammatical appendix. Boston; New York: D. C. Heath & Company. 1931. 2nd edition, 1938
- Mortal hunger; a novel based on the life of Lafcadio Hearn. New York: Sheridan House. 1947. ISBN 1121683673.
- Dictionary of magic. New York: Philosophical Library. 1956. ISBN 0802218296. Wedeck, Harry E. (24 February 2015). 2015 edition. Open Road Media. ISBN 978-1-5040-1094-8.
- Dictionary of the occult. New York: Philosophical Library. 1956. Wedeck, Harry E. (17 December 2019). 2019 edition. Open Road Media. ISBN 978-1-5040-6025-7.
- Short dictionary of classical word origins. Philosophical Library. 1957.
  - Wedeck, Harry E. (January 1957). 2014 pbk reprint. Rowman & Littlefield. ISBN 9781442234338.
- Treasury of witchcraft. Citadel Press. 1961.
  - Treasury of witchcraft : a source book of the magic arts. Bonanza Books. 1989.
- Dictionary of aphrodisiacs. New York: Philosophical Library. 1961.
  - Dictionary of aphrodisiacs. New York: Philosophical Library. 1989; illustrated by Jill Karla Schwarz; designed by Joyce Rothschild
- Dictionary of erotic literature. New York: Philosophical Library. 1962.
- Pictorial history of morals. New York: Philosophical Library. 1963.
- Concise dictionary of medieval history. London: Peter Owen. 1963.
- Study of amatory devices and mores. Citadel Press. 1963.
- Love potions through the ages : a study of amatory devices and mores. New York: Philosophical Library. 1963.
- Triumph of Satan. New Hyde Park, N.Y.: University Books. 1970.
- with Wade Baskin: Dictionary of pagan religions. New York: Philosophical Library. 1971.
  - Wedeck, Harry E.; Baskin, Wade (17 December 2019). Dictionary of Pagan Religions. Open Road Media. ISBN 9781504060189.
- Dictionary of spiritualism. New York: Philosophical Library. 1971.
- Dictionary of astrology: astrological concepts, techniques, and theories. London: P. Owen. 1973.
- with Wade Baskin: Dictionary of gypsy life and lore. New York: Philosophical Library. 1973.
  - Wedeck, Harry E. (8 September 2015). Dictionary of Gypsy Life and Lore. Open Road Media. ISBN 9781504022743.

=== as editor ===
- co-edited with Abram Lipsky: Nārrātiōnēs Biblicae from the Vulgate. New York: Silver, Burdett & Company. 1928.
- co-edited with Wilbert Lester Carr and George Depue Hadzsits: Living language, a second Latin book. Boston; New York: D.C. Heath & Company. 1934.
- co-edited with Wilbert Lester Carr: Latin poetry. Boston: D. C. Heath & Company. 1940.
- Classics of Greek literature, from the literary beginnings to the second century A.D. New York: Philosophical Library. 1963.
- Classics of Roman literature, from the literary beginnings to the end of the silver age. New York: Philosophical Library. 1963.
- Putnam's Dark and Middle Ages reader; selections from the 5th to 15th centuries. New York: Putnam. 1964.
- co-edited with Frederick M. Schweitzer: Dictionary of the Renaissance. New York: Philosophical Library. 1967. ISBN 978-1-5040-6725-6.; 2021 edition. Open Road Media. 25 May 2021. ISBN 978-1-5040-6725-6.

=== as translator ===
- co-translator with Thomas Taylor and others: Kiernan, Thomas P., ed. (1962). Aristotle Dictionary. New York: Philosophical Library; with an introduction by Theodore E. James; Kiernan, Thomas (19 June 2018). 2018 edition. Open Road Media. ISBN 978-1-5040-5504-8.
- The Foundation of Life. New York: Philosophical Library. 1962; especially abridged translation of Fons Vitae, written in Latin by the famous medieval Jewish philosopher Solomon ibn Gabirol
  - Gabirol, Solomon Ibn (October 2011). The Fountain of Life: Fons Vitae. Literary Licensing, LLC. ISBN 9781258180102.
- von Krafft-Ebing, R. (1965) [1886]. Psychopathia sexualis: A medico–forensic study. New York: Putnam; translated from the original German by Harry E. Wedeck
- Courcelle, Pierre (1969). Late Latin Writers and their Greek Sources. Cambridge, Massachusetts: Harvard University Press; translation by Harry E. Wedeck of 2nd edition of Les Lettres grecques en Occident de Macrobe à Cassiodore; xii+467 pages LCCN 69-12721
