= Tomb of Lyson and Kallikles =

Archaeological site in central Macedonia

Coordinates: 40.6526165°N 22.125656°E

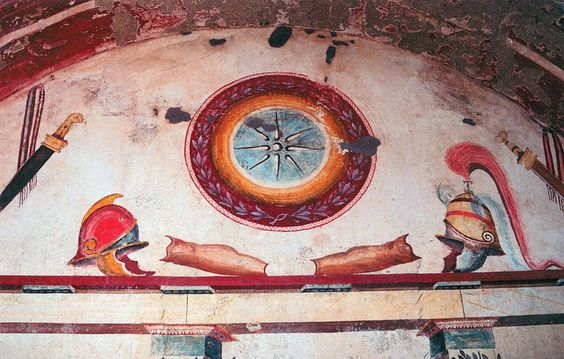
Painting of armour and arms on the rear wall of the antechamber.

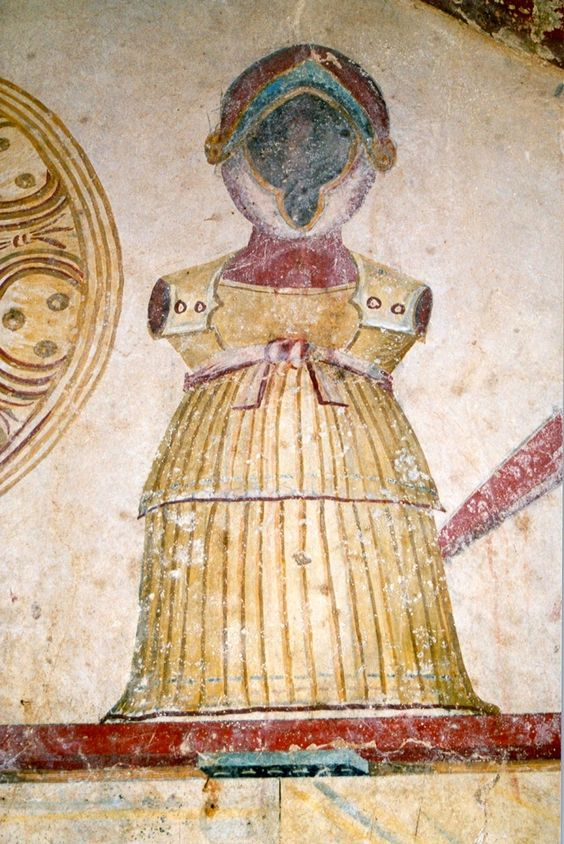
Painting of cuirass on the front wall of the antechamber

The Tomb of Lyson and Kallikles is an ancient Macedonian tomb of the Hellenistic period in Mieza (modern Lefkadia, near Naousa, Imathia), noted for the quality of its painted decoration. The tomb was originally built for the brothers Lyson and Kallikles, sons of Aristophanes, around 250 BC and it continued to be used by their descendants for around a century, going out of use around the time of the Roman conquest.

== Description ==
The tomb consists of two vaulted chambers, an antechamber and a burial chamber on a north–south axis, entered from the south, and covered over by an earthen tumulus.

The antechamber is 0.89 m wide and 0.86 m long. The walls are painted with pilasters, decked with garlands, support an architrave with guttae. This 'architectural style' of the wall paintings may be the earliest surviving example of "perspective" and is seen by Stella G. Miller as a precursor of the Pompeian second style. There is a painting of a perirrhanterion (a water sprinkler used for ritual purification) on the left side wall and an altar with a serpent on the right side wall. The most noted paintings from the tomb are the depictions of weapons and armour in the semicircular areas above the doorways on the rear and front walls, which presumably emphasise Lyson and Kallikles' position as members of the Macedonian military aristocracy. The rear wall depicts a Macedonian shield with the Vergina Sun surrounded by a wreath. Below the shield, there are two greaves, a Phrygian helmet at left and an Attic helmet at right. The whole design is flanked by two swords depicted as if hanging from nails in the roof. The painting in the front wall is similar, but the shield has a different design - a central circle surrounded by a ring of dots and eight smaller circles, each containing three dots and separated from the neighbouring circles by small thunderbolts. This shield design is common on the coinage of the Antigonid kings of Macedon. The shield is flanked by two cuirasses (with helmets) and two swords hanging from nails.

The burial chamber is 3.05 m wide, 3.95 m long, and 1.95 m high. As in the antechamber, the walls are painted with pillars, supporting an architrave with guttae. Between the painted pillars, there are twenty-two niches for the remains of the dead, arranged in two rows (six in the back wall and four on each of the side walls). Only seventeen of these were ever used. Garlands with ribbons are painted above the niches, as well as the names of the dead, starting with Lyson and Kallikles, and continuing with their descendants for four generations. This is the only Macedonian tomb where the names of the occupants are preserved.

The tomb was discovered in 1942 and excavated by Charalambos Makaronas. A full-length study was produced by Stella G. Miller in 1993. A metal protective structure was built over the tomb in 1999. It is not accessible to the public.

== Bibliography ==
- Miller, Stella G. (1993). The tomb of Lyson and Kallikles: a painted Macedonian tomb. Mainz: P. von Zabern. ISBN 978-3-8053-1153-3.
