= Alfred Ernout =

Alfred Ernout (French: [ɛʁnu]; Lille, 30 October 1879 – Paris, 16 June 1973) was a French philologist who specialized in the Latin language.

== Biography ==
Ernout began studying classical philology in Lille and in 1901 finished first at the agrégation de grammaire (a civil service exam for Latin teachers). In 1908, he defended his doctoral thesis on dialectical elements and the passive voice in the Latin of the Republican period. After teaching at the Lycée du Troyes in 1908 and the university of Lille in 1913, he joined the Latin department at the Sorbonne in 1924, alongside Jules Marouzeau. By 1946, he was a professor at the Collège de France.

He collaborated with Antoine Meillet on an etymological dictionary of Latin, and with François Thomas on a Latin grammar that had gone through five editions by 1975.
