= 406 BC =

406 BC in various calendars
- Gregorian calendar: 406 BC; CDVI BC
- Ab urbe condita: 348
- Ancient Egypt era: XXVII dynasty, 120
- Pharaoh: Darius II of Persia, 18
- Ancient Greek Olympiad (summer): 93rd Olympiad, year 3
- Assyrian calendar: 4345
- Balinese saka calendar: N/A
- Bengali calendar: −999 – −998
- Berber calendar: 545
- Buddhist calendar: 139
- Burmese calendar: −1043
- Byzantine calendar: 5103–5104
- Chinese calendar: 甲戌年 (Wood Dog); 2292 or 2085 — to — 乙亥年 (Wood Pig); 2293 or 2086
- Coptic calendar: −689 – −688
- Discordian calendar: 761
- Ethiopian calendar: −413 – −412
- Hebrew calendar: 3355–3356
- Hindu calendars
- Vikram Samvat: −349 – −348
- Shaka Samvat: N/A
- Kali Yuga: 2695–2696
- Holocene calendar: 9595
- Iranian calendar: 1027 BP – 1026 BP
- Islamic calendar: 1059 BH – 1058 BH
- Javanese calendar: N/A
- Julian calendar: N/A
- Korean calendar: 1928
- Minguo calendar: 2317 before ROC 民前2317年
- Nanakshahi calendar: −1873
- Thai solar calendar: 137–138
- Tibetan calendar: ཤིང་ཕོ་ཁྱི་ལོ་ (male Wood-Dog) −279 or −660 or −1432 — to — ཤིང་མོ་ཕག་ལོ་ (female Wood-Boar) −278 or −659 or −1431

Year 406 BC was a year of the pre-Julian Roman calendar. At the time, it was known as the Year of the Tribunate of Cossus, Ambustus, Cossus and Potitus (or, less frequently, year 348 Ab urbe condita). The denomination 406 BC for this year has been used since the early medieval period, when the Anno Domini calendar era became the prevalent method in Europe for naming years.

== Events ==
=== By place ===
==== Greece ====
- Callicratidas is appointed as the navarch of the Spartan fleet, replacing Lysander. Callicratidas assembles a fleet and sails to Methymna, on Lesbos, to which he lays siege. This move threatens the Athenian grain supply.
- Alcibiades is replaced by a board of generals. Athens sends a member of the board, Admiral Conon, to relieve the siege of Mytilene. To defend Lesbos, Conon is forced to move his numerically inferior fleet from Samos to the Hekatonnesi islands near Methymna. When Callicratidas attacks him, Conon is forced back to Mytilene, where he is blockaded by Callicratidas' Spartan fleet.
- Athens wins the Battle of Arginusae, near Lesbos, and the blockade of Conon is broken. To relieve Conon, the Athenians assemble a new fleet composed largely of newly constructed ships crewed by inexperienced sailors. This inexperienced fleet is inferior to the Spartans, but its commanders employ new and unorthodox tactics, which allow the Athenians to secure a dramatic and unexpected victory. The Spartan force is soundly defeated, and Callicratidas is killed.
- Returning to Athens after the battle, Theramenes leads Athenian agitation against the eight generals who have commanded in the engagement; the six who have returned to Athens are condemned for negligence in not having picked up survivors from the ships disabled in the battle. The Athenian generals (including Pericles' son) are put to death.
- Sparta sues for peace, which the Athenian leader Cleophon rejects. Sparta yields to demands by the Persian satrap Cyrus that Lysander command a fleet in the Hellespont.

==== Roman Republic ====
- The Roman forces begin a decade-long siege against Veii.

==== Carthage ====
- The Carthaginians again invade Sicily and attack Agrigentum (Acragas). Plague breaks out in their camp and Hannibal Mago dies. Himilco assumes command and captures Agrigentum (Acragas), Gela and Camarina. Gela is destroyed and its treasures sacked. The survivors take refuge in Syracuse. The plague is carried back to Carthage by its soldiers.

== Deaths ==
- Euripides, Athenian playwright (b. c. 480 BC)
- Hannibal Mago, Carthaginian general
- Sophocles, Athenian dramatist and politician (b. c. 495 BC)
