= Navarch (Sparta) =

Magistrate commanding the fleet in Sparta

The navarch (Greek: ναύαρχος, romanized: nauarchos) was the magistrate who commanded the fleet in Ancient Sparta.

== History and role ==
The powers of the navarch were extensive and were not subordinate to the two Spartan kings. The navarch commanded the fleet, but could also lead his embarked troops on land, performed the sacrifices, distributed wages and booty, negotiated with foreign states, and even administered the territories he captured. An ambitious man such as Lysander could therefore yield formidable influence in Sparta through his time as navarch at the end of the Peloponnesian War (431–404). As a result, Aristotle described the navarchy as another kingship. Indeed, the navarch's powers were probably taken away from the kings at some point during the 6th century, because they had no authority on the sea. For example, Herodotus writes that in 480 king Leotychidas was also navarch at the Battle of Salamis, so it means he had to be navarch to be able to command the fleet.

Herodotus' description of Leotychidas as navarch in 480 is furthermore the first mention of the navarchy in the sources, but it was likely created earlier, perhaps in 512 for the first attack of Sparta against Athens by Anchimolus, likely the first navarch. In the beginning the office was probably irregular and no navarch was appointed for most of the Pentecontaetia (479–431), as the Spartans did not launch any navy during this period. In addition, the navarch was not a yearly magistrate; it depended on the mission given, because Cnemus—the first navarch of the Peloponnesian War—was elected in summer 430, but remained in power for more than 12 months, until the winter of 429/428.

Following the defeat of the Spartan navy at Cyzicus in 410, a law was passed an established fixed terms from spring to spring. In about 400 another law forbade iteration of the office, but repetition was apparently allowed, since Teleutias was probably navarch three times. This law could furthermore be bypassed by appointing a secretary (ἐπιστολεὐς, epistoleus)—in effect vice-admiral—to the navarch; the influential Lysander therefore became secretary twice. The navarchs were elected for one year by the Spartan assembly, supervised by the ephors. One exception took place in 395, when the king Agesilaus II was granted the privilege to appoint the navarch.

It seems the navarchy disappeared after the catastrophic defeat of Leuctra in 371.

== List of Spartan navarchs ==
Year	Name	Service
c.512	Anchimolus	Commanded an expedition against the Athenian tyrant Hippias
481/480	Eurybiades	Commanded at the battles of Artemision and Salamis.
480/479	Leotychidas II	Also king of Sparta.
479/478	Pausanias	Also Spartan regent. Removed from command for medism.
478/477	Dorcis	Replaced Pausanias, but his command was rejected by the Greek allies.
430–429/428	Cnemus	Led an expedition against Zakynthos, then the Acarnanians, but was defeated twice.
427	Alkidas	Brasidas was appointed as his adviser.
426/425	Thrasymelidas	
413/412	Melancridas	
412/411	Astyochus	Relieved from command for incompetence.
411/410	Mindarus	
410/409	Pasippidas	Condemned for his dealings with the Persian satrap Tissaphernes.
409/408	Cratesippidas	
408/407	Lysander	
407/406	Callicratidas	Died during the battle of Arginusae.
406/405	Eteonicus	
405/404	Aracus	Lysander served as his secretary.
404/403	Libys	Brother of Lysander.
403/402	Panthoidas?	
402/401	Samius	Sent to help the Ionian cities that revolted against Persia.
401/400	Anaxibius	
398/397	Pharax	
397/396	Archelaidas	
396/395	Pollis	
395/394	Cheiricrates	
394/393	Podanemus	
393/392	Herippidas?	
392/391	Teleutias	First term. Half-brother of Agesilaus II.
391/390	Ekdicus	
390/389	Teleutias	Second term.
389/388	Hierax	
388/387	Antalcidas	Drafted the Peace of Antalcidas with Persia.
387/386	Teleutias	Third term.
377/376	Pollis	Perhaps an homonym of the navarch of 396/395.
376/375	Nicolochus	
375/374	Aristocrates	
374/373	Alcidas	
373/372	Mnasippus	

== Bibliography ==
=== Ancient sources ===
- Aristotle, Politics.

=== Modern sources ===
- Paul Cartledge, Sparta and Lakonia, A Regional History 1300–362 BC, London, Routledge, 2002 (originally published in 1979). ISBN 0-415-26276-3
- Caroline Falkner, "Astyochus, Sparta's Incompetent Navarch?", Phoenix, Vol. 53, No. 3/4 (Autumn - Winter, 1999), pp. 206–221. JSTOR 1088984
- Simon Hornblower, A Commentary on Thucydides, Volume I, Books I-III, Oxford, Clarendon Press, 1991. ISBN 0-19-815099-7
- Paul Poralla & Alfred S. Bradford, Prosopographie der Lakedaimonier, bis auf die Zeit Alexanders des Grossen, Chicago, 1985 (originally published in 1913). OCLC 1151065049
- Paul A. Rahe, Sparta's First Attic War, The Grand Strategy of Classical Sparta, 478–446 B.C., New Haven, Yale University Press, 2019. ISBN 978-0-300-24261-4
- Raphael Sealey, "Die spartanische Nauarchie", Klio, 58, 1976, pp. 335–358. doi:10.1524/klio.1976.58.12.335
- Lukas Thommen, "Xenophon und die spartanische Nauarchie", Historika, Storia Greca i Romana, V. 5: Great is the power of the sea, 2015, pp. 313–320.
