= 404 BC =

404 BC in various calendars
- Gregorian calendar: 404 BC; CDIV BC
- Ab urbe condita: 350
- Ancient Egypt era: XXVIII dynasty, 1
- Pharaoh: Amyrtaeus, 1
- Ancient Greek Olympiad (summer): 94th Olympiad (victor)¹
- Assyrian calendar: 4347
- Balinese saka calendar: N/A
- Bengali calendar: −997 – −996
- Berber calendar: 547
- Buddhist calendar: 141
- Burmese calendar: −1041
- Byzantine calendar: 5105–5106
- Chinese calendar: 丙子年 (Fire Rat); 2294 or 2087 — to — 丁丑年 (Fire Ox); 2295 or 2088
- Coptic calendar: −687 – −686
- Discordian calendar: 763
- Ethiopian calendar: −411 – −410
- Hebrew calendar: 3357–3358
- Hindu calendars
- Vikram Samvat: −347 – −346
- Shaka Samvat: N/A
- Kali Yuga: 2697–2698
- Holocene calendar: 9597
- Iranian calendar: 1025 BP – 1024 BP
- Islamic calendar: 1057 BH – 1055 BH
- Javanese calendar: N/A
- Julian calendar: N/A
- Korean calendar: 1930
- Minguo calendar: 2315 before ROC 民前2315年
- Nanakshahi calendar: −1871
- Thai solar calendar: 139–140
- Tibetan calendar: མེ་ཕོ་བྱི་བ་ལོ་ (male Fire-Rat) −277 or −658 or −1430 — to — མེ་མོ་གླང་ལོ་ (female Fire-Ox) −276 or −657 or −1429

Year 404 BC was a year of the pre-Julian Roman calendar. At the time, it was known as the Year of the Tribunate of Volusus, Cossus, Fidenas, Ambustus, Maluginensis and Rutilus (or, less frequently, year 350 Ab urbe condita). The denomination 404 BC for this year has been used since the early medieval period, when the Anno Domini calendar era became the prevalent method in Europe for naming years.

== Events ==
=== By place ===
==== Greece ====
- The Athenian leader Cleophon continues to urge resistance against the Peloponnesians, but the situation becomes desperate and he is arrested, condemned to death and executed.
- Athens, full of refugees and weakened by plague and hunger, capitulates and the Peloponnesian War ends.
- Theramenes secures terms that save the city of Athens from destruction. The Spartans allow Athens to retain its independence. However, Athens loses all its foreign possessions and what is left of its fleet and is required to become an ally of Sparta. The Long Walls around Athens are pulled down. Greek towns across the Aegean Sea in Ionia are again the subjects of the Persian Empire.
- The Spartan general, Lysander, puts in place a puppet government in Athens with the establishment of the oligarchy of the "Thirty Tyrants" under Critias and including Theramenes as a leading member. This government executes a number of citizens and deprives all but a few of their rights.
- Many of Athens' former allies are now ruled by boards of ten (decarchy), often reinforced with garrisons under a Spartan commander (Harmost).
- The Athenian general Thrasybulus is exiled by the Thirty Tyrants, and he retires to Thebes.
- A split develops between Theramenes and Critias who has Theramenes killed (by drinking poison) on charges of treason.
- Emerging after the Spartan victory at Aegospotami, the former Athenian leader, Alcibiades, takes refuge in Phrygia in northwestern Asia Minor with the Persian satrap, Pharnabazus, and seeks their assistance for the Athenians. The Spartans discover his plans and arrange with Pharnabazus to have him assassinated.
- Lysander sails to Samos and conquers it for Sparta.

==== Egypt ====
- Amyrtaeus of Sais successfully leads a revolt against the Persian Empire's control of the Egyptian delta. He becomes the first (and only) pharaoh of the Twenty-eighth Dynasty.

==== Persian Empire ====
- The Persian King Darius II dies of an illness in Babylon. He is succeeded by his son Artaxerxes II (Memnon—'the Mindful').
- Darius II's younger son, Cyrus, is accused by Tissaphernes, the satrap of Caria, of plotting his brother Artaxerxes II's murder. On the intercession of Artaxerxes II and Cyrus's mother, Parysatis, however, Cyrus is pardoned and sent back to his satrapy.

== Deaths ==
- Alcibiades, Athenian statesman (b. c. 450 BC)
- Cleophon, Athenian politician and demagogue
- Darius II Ochus, King of the Persian Empire
- Theramenes, Athenian statesman
