= The Frogs =

Comedy by Aristophanes

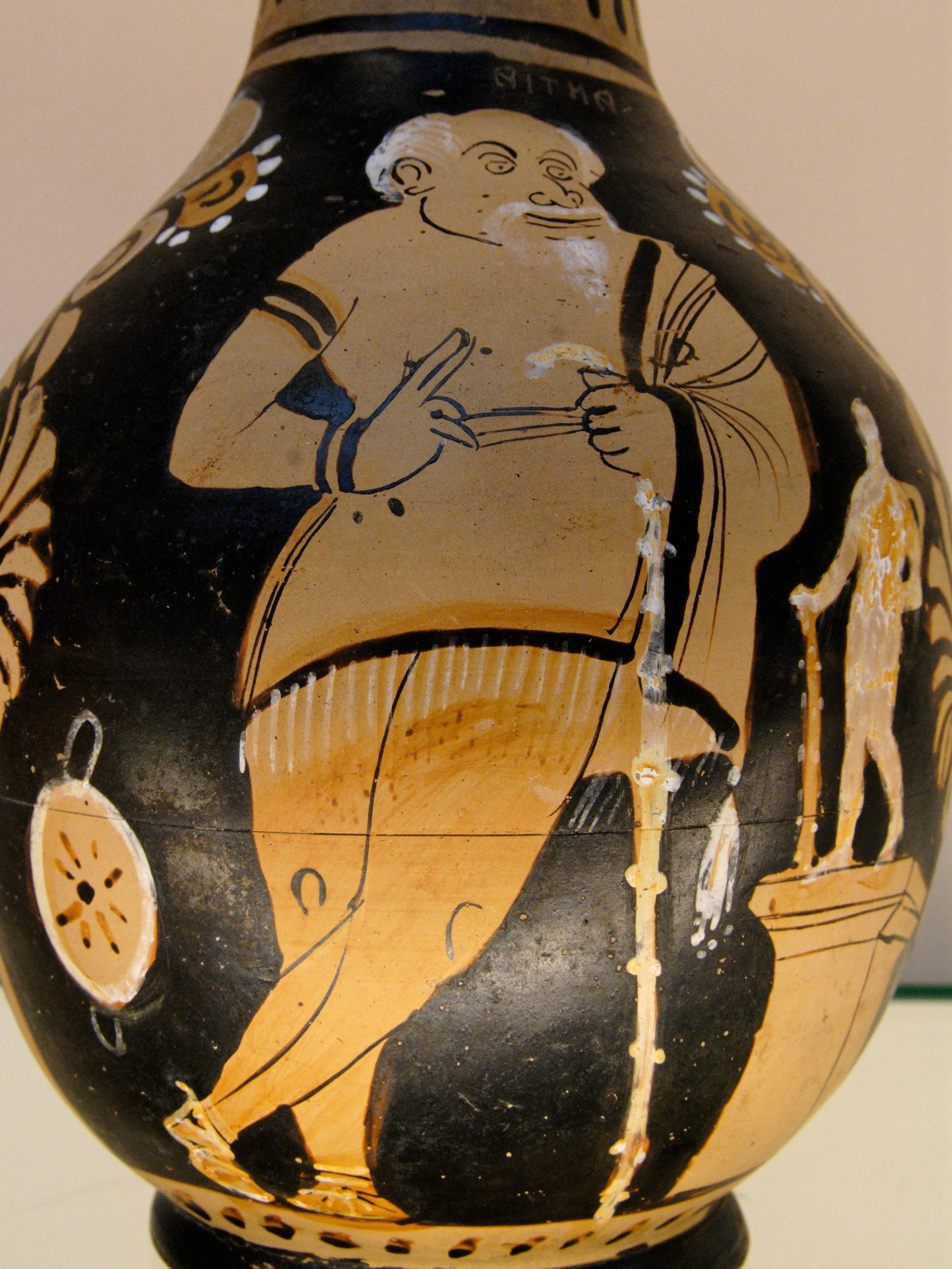
- Red-figure vase painting showing an actor dressed as Xanthias in The Frogs, standing next to a statuette of Heracles
- Written by: Aristophanes
- Chorus: Frogs, Initiates, citizens of Hades
- Characters: Dionysus; Xanthias, Dionysus' slave Heracles; A corpse Charon; Janitor of Hades; A maid Hostess; Plathane, maid of the inn Euripides; Aeschylus; Pluto various extras
- Setting: Outside Heracles' house; Lake Acheron; Hades

The Frogs (Ancient Greek: Βάτραχοι, romanized: Bátrakhoi; Latin: Ranae, often abbreviated Ran. or Ra.) is a comedy written by the Ancient Greek playwright Aristophanes. It was performed at the Lenaia, one of the Festivals of Dionysus in Athens, in 405 BC and received first place.

The play features the comical katabasis of the god of theater Dionysus, with his slave Xanthias, in order to revive the late tragedian Euripides. Dionysus is frustrated with tragedy's decline in quality after the playwright's recent passing, and concerned about theatre's future as the city of Athens struggles in the Peloponnesian War. During the pair's journey through the underworld, the god cravenly and unsuccessfully attempts to evade trouble after masquerading as Heracles, still infamous for his prior kidnapping of the guard-dog Cerberus. At the palace of Pluto, Dionysus then adjudicates a fierce debate between Euripides and Aeschylus for the underworld's throne of tragic drama. Aeschylus wins due to his pragmatism, and Dionysus ends up reviving him instead. The play's title derives from the first choral interlude (parodos), where the chorus, a group of frogs, exasperate Dionysus in song.

A defining work of Old Comedy, The Frogs contains a mix of irreverent humour and highbrow satire of Athenian politics, religion and theatre, commenting on poetry's moral role in civic and political life. The play is notably characterised by its extensive literary criticism and references: the second half's agon between Euripides and Aeschylus examines both figures' differing approaches to tragedy. In 1974, the play was loosely adapted into a musical of the same name by Stephen Sondheim and Burt Shevelove. This adaptation features the Irish playwright George Bernard Shaw and English playwright William Shakespeare, in place of Euripides and Aeschylus respectively.

== Plot ==
Dionysus is travelling with his slave Xanthias to the underworld. Xanthias, carrying Dionysus' baggage, attempts to make fun of his heavy load with toilet humour – the jokes he believes the audiences are expecting from this situation – but the god frustratedly pre-empts his remarks. To find a reliable path to Hades, Dionysus seeks advice from his half-brother Heracles, who had been there before in order to retrieve the hell hound Cerberus. Dionysus shows up at his doorstep dressed in a lion-hide and carrying a club. Heracles, upon seeing the effeminate Dionysus dressed up like himself, cannot help laughing. Dionysus explains his motivation for travelling to Hades: to bring the playwright Euripides back from the dead, in order to correct what he sees as the sorry state of Athens' tragedians. When Dionysus asks which road is the quickest to get to Hades, Heracles tells him that he can hang himself, drink poison or jump off a tower. Dionysus opts for the longer journey, which Heracles himself had taken, across a lake (possibly Lake Acheron).

When Dionysus arrives at the lake, Charon ferries him across. Xanthias, being a slave, is not allowed in the boat, and has to walk around it, while Dionysus is made to help row the boat. The eponymous chorus of frogs (the only instance of frogs in the play) sing the parodos, the first choral interlude. Their croaking refrain – Brekekekèx-koàx-koáx (Greek: Βρεκεκεκὲξ κοὰξ κοάξ) – greatly annoys Dionysus, who engages in a mocking debate (agon) with the frogs. When he arrives at the shore, Dionysus meets up with Xanthias, who teases him by claiming to see the frightening monster Empusa. A second chorus composed of spirits of Dionysian Mystics soon appear.

The next encounter is with Hades' janitor, who mistakes Dionysus for Heracles due to his attire. (Note: The janitor is popularly identified as Aeacus by both ancient and modern sources, but not explicitly identified in the original text.) Still angry over Heracles' theft of Cerberus, he threatens to unleash several monsters on him in revenge. Frightened, Dionysus trades clothes with Xanthias. A maid then arrives and is happy to see Heracles. She invites him to a feast with virgin dancing girls, and Xanthias is more than happy to oblige, but Dionysus quickly wants to trade back the clothes. Dionysus, back in the Heracles lion-skin, encounters more people angry at Heracles, and so he makes Xanthias trade a third time. When the janitor returns to confront the alleged Heracles, Xanthias offers him his "slave" (Dionysus) for torturing, to obtain the truth as to whether or not he is really a thief. The terrified Dionysus tells the truth that he is a god. After each is whipped, the janitor admits he is unable to tell which one is a god, and takes Dionysus to be verified offstage by Pluto and Persephone. In the parabasis, the chorus comments on the political state of Athens, criticising its inconsistency with granting citizenships, and its lack of meritocracy.

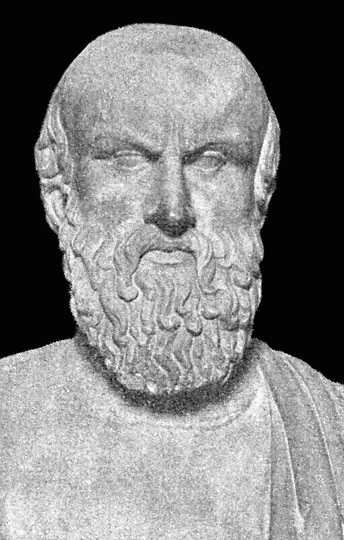
Bust of Aeschylus from the Capitoline Museum

Working in Pluto's palace, Xanthias and another slave delight in mocking their own masters: the latter explains the ongoing contest between Euripides and Aeschylus. Euripides, who had only just recently died, is challenging the great Aeschylus for the seat of "Best Tragic Poet" at the dinner table of Pluto, the ruler of the underworld. (It is explained that Sophocles has forgone participation in the contest, due to his deferentiality towards Aeschylus.) A contest is held with Dionysus as judge. The two playwrights take turns quoting verses from their plays and making fun of the other. Euripides argues the characters in his plays are better because they are more true to life and logical, whereas Aeschylus believes his idealized characters are better as they are heroic and models for virtue. Aeschylus mocks Euripides' verse as predictable and formulaic by having Euripides quote lines from many of his prologues, each time interrupting the declamation with the same phrase "ληκύθιον ἀπώλεσεν" ("... lost his little flask of oil"). (The passage has given rise to the term lekythion for this type of rhythmic group in poetry.) Euripides counters by demonstrating the alleged monotony of Aeschylus' choral songs, parodying excerpts from his works and having each citation end in the same refrain ἰὴ κόπον οὐ πελάθεις ἐπ᾽ ἀρωγάν; ("oh, what a stroke, won't you come to the rescue?", from Aeschylus' lost play Myrmidons). Aeschylus retorts by mocking Euripides' choral meters and lyric monodies with castanets.

In a first attempt to end the debate, a balance is brought in and each are told to tell a few lines into it. Whoever's lines have the most "weight" will cause the balance to tip in their favour. Euripides produces verses of his that mention, in turn, the ship Argo, Persuasion and a mace. Aeschylus responds with the river Spercheios, Death and two crashed chariots, each with a dead charioteer. Since the latter verses refer to "heavier" objects, Aeschylus wins, but Dionysus is still unable to decide whom he will revive, so he reveals the intent of his visit: to save the city of Athens, currently at the losing end of the Peloponnesian War, and its dramatic scene by extension. He decides to take the poet who gives the best political advice: firstly, what the Athenians should do with the exiled Alcibiades, and secondly, how each of the poets thinks the city can be saved. Euripides gives cleverly worded but essentially meaningless answers while Aeschylus provides more practical advice, and Dionysus decides to take Aeschylus back instead of Euripides. Pluto allows Aeschylus to return to life so that Athens may be succoured in her hour of need and invites everyone to a round of farewell drinks. Before leaving, Aeschylus proclaims that Sophocles should have his chair while he is gone, not Euripides.

== Critical analysis ==
The parodos contains a paradigmatic example of how in Greek culture obscenity could be included in celebrations related to the gods.

=== Historical context ===
The Frogs was written and performed during the final stages of the Peloponnesian War. Sophocles and Euripides, two Greek playwrights regarded as some of the most talented poets of their time, had recently died. During the creation of the narrative, Sparta and its allies had blockaded Athens and within six months after the production of The Frogs, Athens was defeated in a battle at sea, surrendering to Sparta.

=== Politics ===
Kenneth Dover argues that the underlying political theme of The Frogs is essentially "old ways good, new ways bad". He points to the parabasis for proof of this: "The antepirrhema of the parabasis (718–37) urges the citizen-body to reject the leadership of those whom it now follows, upstarts of foreign parentage (730–2), and turn back to men of known integrity who were brought up in the style of noble and wealthy families" (Dover 33). Kleophon is mentioned in the ode of the parabasis (674–85), and is both "vilified as a foreigner" (680–2) and maligned at the end of the play (1504, 1532).

W. Geoffrey Arnott argues that The Frogs is used as a tactic to educate and advise the public. There are many passages within the play that paint poets and playwrights as educators and teachers. There is a particular section in which the character “Aeschylus” claims that after he produced his play “Persians”, he educated Athenian audiences to be resilient in vanquishing their enemies. The theme of poets functioning as advisors within The Frogs is driven by the play's three main characters: Aeschylus, Euripides, and Dionysus.

Aristophanes himself acts as an educator and advisor regarding political issues through his writing. This is most prevalent during the Parabasis in which the chorus pleads to the audience for the return of exiled oligarchs who had been cast out during the reinstatement of Athenian democracy in 410. This parabasis has been credited as one of the biggest reasons for The Frogs' success at the Lenaea of 405. Its 1st place victory at Lanaea may have assisted in the development of a political environment that held more favour towards those exiled. In 405 those exiled, although not ordered to, were granted the ability to return to Athens and re-collect their citizenship rights under a set of conditions preserved in Andocides’ speech “On the Mysteries”.

The Frogs deviates from the pattern of political standpoint offered in Aristophanes' earlier works, such as The Acharnians (425 BC), Peace (421 BC), and Lysistrata (411 BC), which have all been termed 'peace' plays. The Frogs is not often thus labeled, however – Dover points out that though Kleophon was adamantly opposed to any peace which did not come of victory, and the last lines of the play suggest Athens ought to look for a less stubborn end to the war, Aeschylus' advice (1463–5) lays out a plan to win and not a proposition of capitulation. Also, The Frogs contains solid, serious messages which represent significant differences from general critiques of policy and idealistic thoughts of good peace terms. During the parabasis Aristophanes presents advice to give the rights of citizens back to people who had participated in the oligarchic revolution in 411 BC, arguing they were misled by Phrynichus' 'tricks' (literally 'wrestlings'). Phrynichus was a leader of the oligarchic revolution who was assassinated, to general satisfaction, in 411. This proposal was simple enough to be instated by a single act of the assembly, and was actually put into effect by Patrokleides' decree after the loss of the fleet at Aegospotami. The anonymous Life states that this advice was the basis of Aristophanes' receipt of the olive wreath, and the author of the ancient Hypothesis says admiration of the parabasis was the major factor that led to the play's second production.

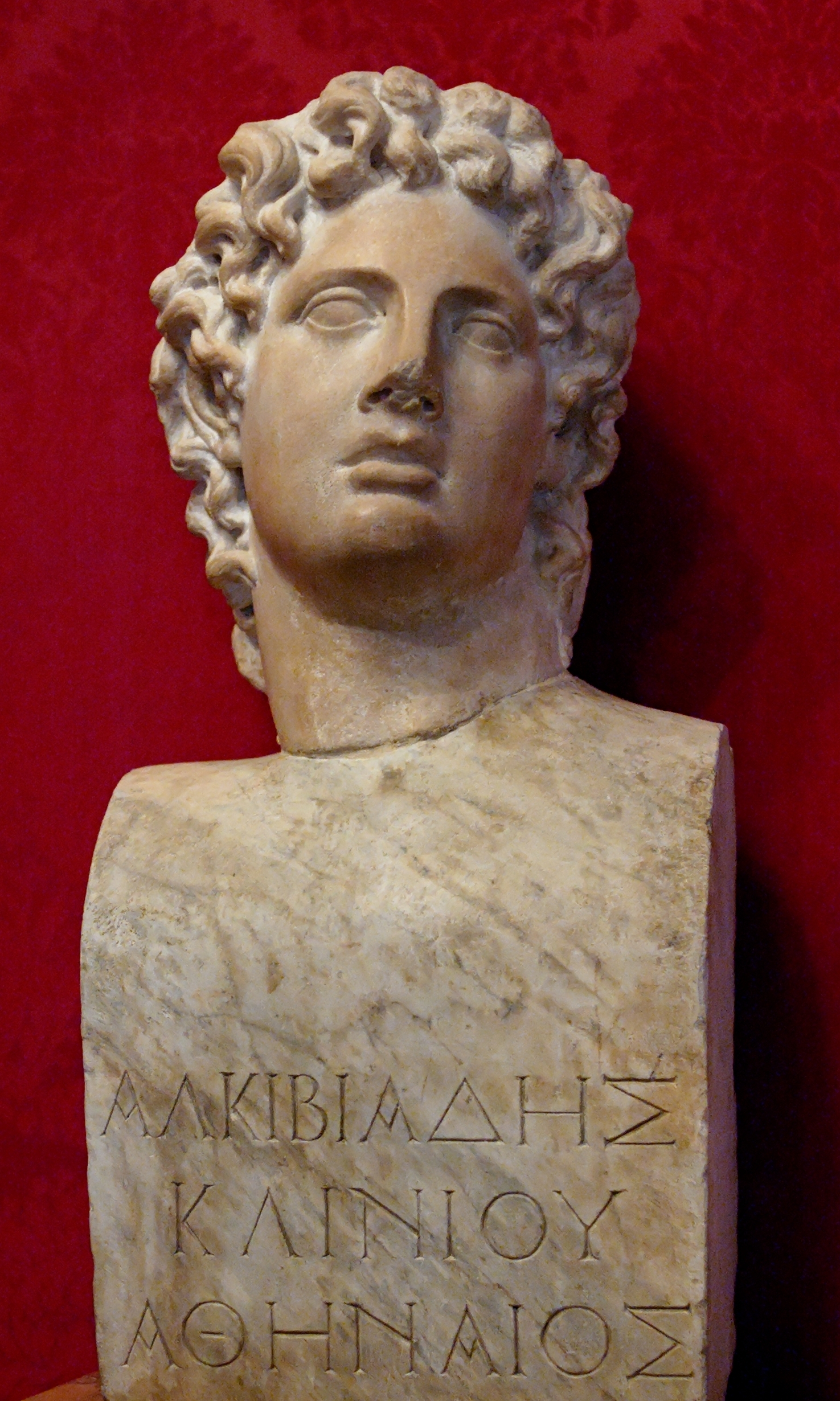
Marble bust from the fourth century BC depicting Alcibiades, who is referenced throughout the play

The Frogs' influence on political issues at the time of its performance are clear. This can be used as an example to support Aristotle’s claims about society and political participation:

Hence it is evident that the state is a creation of nature, and that man is by nature a political animal. And he who by nature and not by mere accident is without a state, is either a bad man or above humanity; he is like the: Tribeless, lawless, hearthless one,’ whom Homer denounces—the natural outcast is forthwith a lover of war; he may be compared to an isolated piece at draughts. - Aristotle, Politics 1.2

Here Aristotle is arguing that it is in human nature to be involved in politics and being uninvolved is a negative trait. The Frogs can be examined through this lens, relating its emphasis on the political change to the attitudes sustained in Athens regarding education and civil duty. Aristotle further claims that theatre is used to comment on societal issues, and present solutions through their demonstration and the use of realism in theatre:

... supposing the charge is "That is not true," one can meet it by saying "But perhaps it ought to be," just as Sophocles said that he portrayed people as they ought to be and Euripides portrayed them as they are ... - Aristotle, Poetics 1460b

J. T. Sheppard contends that the exiled general Alcibiades is a main focus of The Frogs. At the time the play was written and produced, Athens was in dire straits in the war with the Peloponnesian League, and the people, Sheppard argues, would logically have Alcibiades on their minds. Sheppard quotes a segment of text from near the beginning of the parabasis:

But remember these men also, your own kinsmen, sire and son,

Who have oftimes fought beside you, spilt their blood on many seas;

Grant for that one fault the pardon which they crave you on their knees.

You whom nature made for wisdom, let your vengeance fall to sleep;

Greet as kinsmen and Athenians, burghers true to win and keep,

Whosoe'er will brave the storms and fight for Athens at your side!

— Murray translation, from l. 697

He states that though this text ostensibly refers to citizens dispossessed of their rights, it will actually evoke memories of Alcibiades, the Athenians' exiled hero. Further support includes the presentation of the chorus, who recites these lines, as initiates of the mysteries. This, Sheppard says, will also prompt recollection of Alcibiades, whose initial exile was largely based on impiety regarding these religious institutions. Continuing this thought, the audience is provoked into remembering Alcibiades' return in 408 BC, when he made his peace with the goddesses. The reason Aristophanes hints so subtly at these points, according to Sheppard, is because Alcibiades still had many rivals in Athens, such as Kleophon and Adeimantus, who are both blasted in the play. Sheppard also cites Aeschylus during the prologue debate, when the poet quotes from The Oresteia:

Subterranean Hermes, guardian of my father's realms,
Become my saviour and my ally, in answer to my prayer.
For I am come and do return to this my land.

— Dillon translation, from l. 1127

This choice of excerpt again relates to Alcibiades, still stirring his memory in the audience. Sheppard concludes by referencing the direct mention of Alcibiades' name, which occurs in the course of Dionysus' final test of the poets, seeking advice about Alcibiades himself and a strategy for victory. Though Euripides first blasts Alcibiades, Aeschylus responds with the advice to bring him back, bringing the subtle allusions to a clearly stated head and concluding Aristophanes' point.

== Place in Greek theatre ==
=== Development in theatre ===
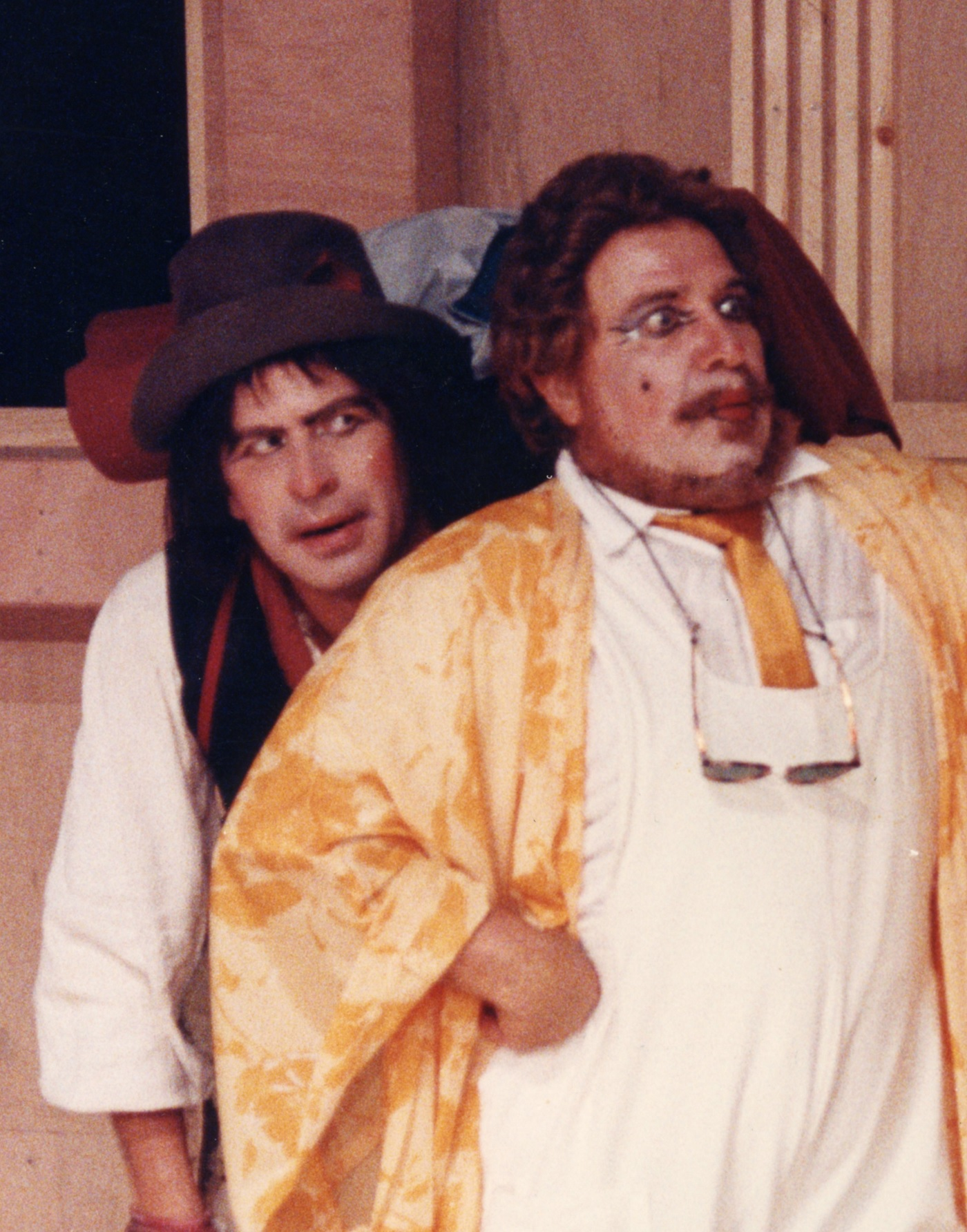
Kostas Triantafyllopoulos (Xanthias) and Thymios Karakatsanis (Dionysus) in Aristophanes' "The Frogs" (Ancient Theatre of Epidaurus, 1990)

The Frogs proved to be a revolutionary piece of media. Through its fascination with education and authorship, the play greatly advances ideas on criticism in theatre that are still seen in contemporary debates and cultural politics. The text is dissected and analyzed, quite literally weighted, within the play itself, prompting the audience to also do so in their viewership. Lines throughout the play point to the intelligence of the newly literate Athens:

"But if you're both afraid that our spectators lack a certain amount of knowledge, so as not to appreciate the fine points of what you say, don't worry about that, since that is no longer the case. For they are seasoned veterans and each one has a book and understands the clever stuff. Their minds are superior anyway, but now they're really sharpened. So fear not, but scrutinize every topic, for the audience's sake at least, since they're so sophisticated." -Chorus, The Frogs (lines 1110-1118)

In an Athens filled with educated citizens, dramatic performance traditions can be scrutinized for the audience's amusement. Within the wider net of social and political judgment, critiquing poetry can reveal what the audience values and what ideas they promote within the city of Athens. The Frogs can also be identified as a piece dedicated to the poetic tradition as it is reaching the end of its era with the deaths of Sophocles and Euripides. Within the story, poets debate about cultural politics ranging from poetry to education in the newly democratic city. These arguments present questions about what drama should be about, what poets actually teach to their audiences, and the type of language poets and playwrights should use. The Frogs exhibit the ways in which civic life and drama are intertwined, enabling the analysis of theater’s impact on politics and cultural development that has continued today.

=== Canonization ===
The Frogs acts as an early form of Greek canonization. After the deaths of Euripides and Sophocles, the importance of written work in Ancient Greece became highly regarded throughout the region. Although the two authors could no longer produce new plays, their previous works could remain in the minds of Greek audiences through the form of written text. Since the plays were written down, they could also be reperformed. The Frogs presents the beginnings of the Greek literary canon by displaying Euripides, Aeschylus, and Sophocles as some of the most witty, eloquent, topical, and culturally influential playwrights of the time.

The Frogs highlight Athenian cultures' transition into a more literary society. Many passages in the play reference the sophisticated intellectualism that became associated with Athenians who could and would often read and write. The play’s focus on featuring famous playwrights of the time emphasizes the scholarly advances occurring during the 5th century BCE, serving the goal of preserving cultural memory.

=== Structure ===
According to Kenneth Dover, the structure of The Frogs is as follows: In the first section Dionysus' has the goal of gaining admission to Pluto's palace, and he does so by line 673. The parabasis follows, (lines 674–737) and in the dialogue between the slaves a power struggle between Euripides and Aeschylus is revealed. Euripides is jealous of the other's place as the greatest tragic poet. Dionysus is asked by Pluto to mediate the contest or agon.

Charles Paul Segal argues that The Frogs is unique in its structure, because it combines two forms of comic motifs, a journey motif and a contest or agon motif, with each motif being given equal weight in the play.

Segal contends that Aristophanes transformed the Greek comedy structure when he downgraded the contest or agon which usually preceded the parabasis and expanded the parabasis into the agon. In Aristophanes' earlier plays, i.e., The Acharnians and The Birds, the protagonist is victorious prior to the parabasis and after the parabasis is usually shown implementing his reforms. Segal suggests that this deviation gave a tone of seriousness to the play.

== References to the play ==
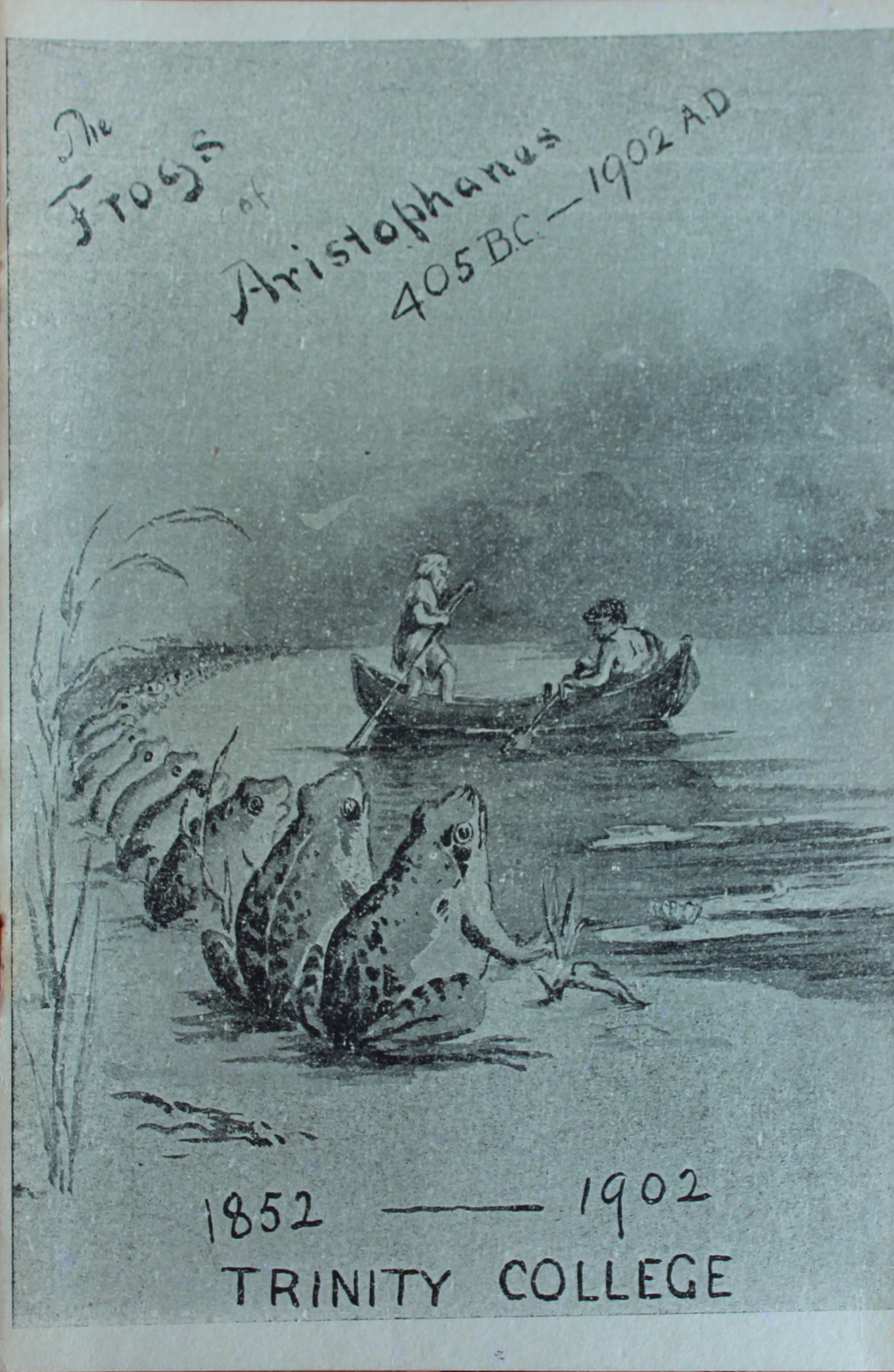
A 1902 playbill of The Frogs

In the Gilbert and Sullivan light opera The Pirates of Penzance, Major-General Stanley, in his introductory song, includes the fact that he "knows the croaking chorus from The Frogs of Aristophanes" in a list of all his scholarly achievements.

Hope Mirrlees's Paris: A Poem (1920) cites the chorus in the opening of her modernist poem: "Brekekekek coax coax we are passing under the Seine" (line 10), which also performs the sound of the metro train.

Finnegans Wake references this play with the words "Brékkek Kékkek Kékkek Kékkek! Kóax Kóax Kóax! Ualu Ualu Ualu! Quaouauh!"

The call of the Frog Chorus, "Brekekekéx-koáx-koáx" (Greek: Βρεκεκεκέξ κοάξ κοάξ), followed by a few of Charon's lines from the play, formed part of the Yale "Long Cheer", which was first used in public in 1884, and was a feature of Yale sporting events from that time until the 1960s. Lake Forest Academy's teams are known as the "Caxys", a name derived from a similar cheer.

The Long Cheer was echoed in Yale graduate Cole Porter's song "I, Jupiter" in his musical Out of This World, in which Jupiter sings "I, Jupiter Rex, am positively teeming with sex," and is answered by the chorus "Brek-ek-ko-ex-ko-ex-SEX! Brek-ek-ko-ex-ko-ex-SEX!" Other colleges imitated or parodied the long cheer, including Penn, which adopted the cry, "Brackey Corax Corix, Roree". One of these parodies was the first Stanford Axe yell in 1899, when yell leaders used it during the decapitation of a straw effigy: "Give 'em the axe, the axe, the axe!" The Frog Chorus also figured in a later Axe Yell rendering the last two segments "croax croax", which was used by the University of California and Stanford University.

In his book Jesting Pilate, author Aldous Huxley describes listening to a performance of a poem on the subject of Sicily by the Panjabi poet Iqbal, recited by a Mohammedan of Arab descent at a party in Bombay. Huxley summarized the performance with the statement: "And in the suspended notes, in the shakes and warblings over a single long-drawn syllable, I seemed to recognize that distinguishing feature of the Euripidean chorus which Aristophanes derides and parodies in the Frogs".

== Adaptations ==
In 1969, London's Unity Theatre staged The Frogs and Co ... Axed!, a musical adaptation by Raymond Cross and Bert Bennett.

A musical adaptation with music and lyrics by Stephen Sondheim and a book by Burt Shevelove premiered in 1974 at Yale University's Olympic-size swimming pool. The ensemble cast included then Yale students Meryl Streep, Sigourney Weaver and Christopher Durang. It later premiered on Broadway in 2004 with additional songs by Sondheim and revisions to the book by Nathan Lane.
