= Battle of Mytilene (406 BC) =

Naval battle between Sparta and Athens, part of the Peloponnesian Wars

- Part of the Peloponnesian War
Date	406 BC
Location	Mytilene
Result	Spartan victory

Belligerents
Athens	Sparta

Commanders and leaders
Conon	Callicratidas

Strength
70 ships	170 ships

Casualties and losses
30 ships	

The Battle of Mytilene was fought in 406 BC between Athens and Sparta. The Spartans were victorious.

Shortly after the Battle of Notium, the Spartan Callicratidas took over command of the Peloponnesian fleet from Lysander. Raiding Methymna in Lesbos, he sent a message to the Athenian naval commander Conon, declaring that he would put an end to Conon's command of the sea. Soon thereafter, Callicratidas caught Conon's fleet of seventy ships at sea and pursued him towards Mytilene Harbor on Lesbos, where in the ensuing battle, Conon lost thirty ships. Conon drew the remaining forty ships up onto the beach, but while blockading him from sea, Callicratidas also surrounded him on land, having transported land forces from Chios and gaining the aid of the Methymnaeans.

Conon sent two ships to run the Peloponnesian blockade, with one setting course for the Hellespont and the other for the open sea. The Peloponnesians captured the later ship, but the former escaped and notified Athens of Conon's plight. In the meantime Callicratidas also captured an additional ten Athenian ships that had appeared in the Straits of Mytilene to attempt to aid Conon.

Upon hearing of Conon's plight, Athens dispatched a fleet of one hundred and ten ships to Samos, where the fleet picked up additional ships from the Samians and other allies, bringing the size of the fleet to one hundred and fifty. Callicratidas sailed with one hundred and twenty of his own ships to intercept the Athenians; this led to the major Battle of Arginusae.

== See also ==
- Battle of Arginusae
