= Telycrates =

Telycrates the Leucadian (Ancient Greek: Τηλυκράτης) was a Greek admiral who took part in the battle of Aegospotami. He fought in the side of Peloponnesian alliance, since Lefkas was a colony of Corinth. He is referred by the geographer Pausanias in his 10th book. Pausanias refers concretely that during his travel in Delphi he saw the statues of allies of Lysander in the battle of Aegospotami. One of these was of Telycrates. Today, the football club of Lefkas is named Tylikratis after him.
