= Callixenus (given name) =

Callixenus was an Athenian politician who aggressively prosecuted those held to be to blame for the disaster at the Battle of Arginusae in 406 BC. Callixenus, Kallixenus or Kallixenos may also be used as a given name.

It may refer to:

== People with the given name ==
- Callixenus Alcmaeonidae, nephew of Cleisthenes and head of the Alcmaeonids, ostracized in 485 BC
- Callixenus of Rhodes, Hellenistic historian, main source for the Tessarakonteres
