= Honorary decrees for the Samians =

Ancient Greek decrees

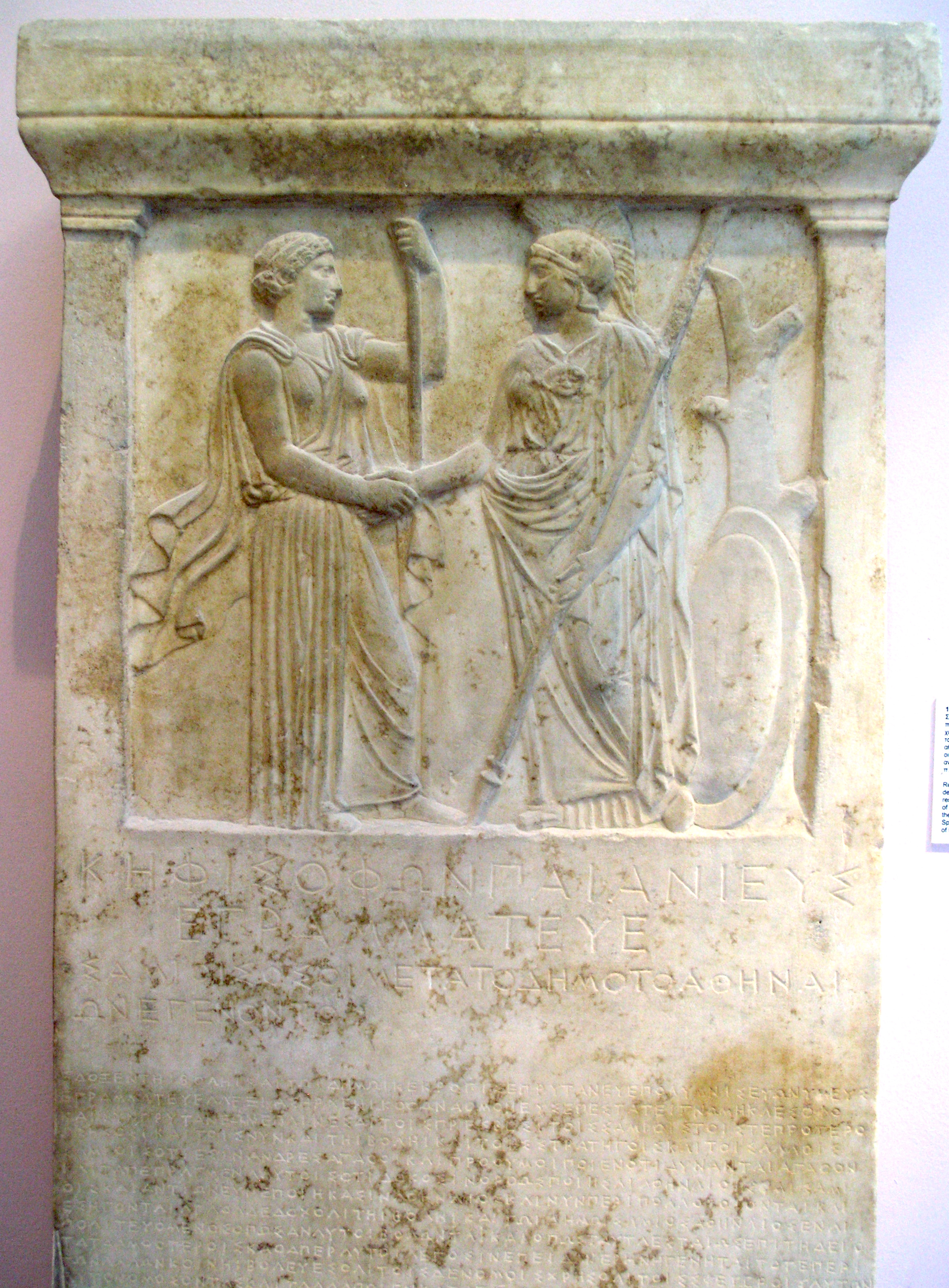
- Athena and Hera confirm their alliance with a cordial handshake
- Year: 405–402 BC
- Catalogue: 1333
- Dimensions: 165 cm × 53 cm (65 in × 21 in)
- Location: Acropolis Museum, Athens

Samian Decree (Ancient Greek: Ψήφισμα των Σαμίων) is an Attic relief. The largest and most important fragment was discovered in 1888 during the excavations of the Acropolis of Athens, while two other fragments had already been found in 1876 in the Theatre of Dionysus. A fourth fragment was discovered later, probably among finds from the Acropolis excavations, and was added in 1903. It is kept in the Acropolis Museum in Athens (inv. no. 1333).

== Description ==
The stele, whose decorative element is the relief, is made of Pentelic marble. It has a total height of 1.65 metres and a width of 52–55 centimetres. The relief scene is framed by a projecting horizontal epistyle supported by two slender side pilasters with a cornice. It shows the goddess Athena on the right and the goddess Hera on the left. Athena clasps Hera's hand. Below the relief are carved three Athenian decrees of the Boule and the demos of the Athenians, which have been fully studied and translated.

It bears the following inscriptions: «ΚΗΦΙΣΟΦΩΝ ΠΑΙΑΝΕΥΣ ΕΓΡΑΜΜΑΤΕΥΕ» ("Kephisophon of Paiania served as secretary.") and «ΣΑΜΙΟΙΣ ΟΣΟΙ ΜΕΤΑ ΤΟ ΔΗΜΟ ΤΟ ΑΘΗΝΑΙΩΝ ΕΓΕΝΟΝΤΟ» ("To the Samians who became allies of the Athenian People.").

== Historical background ==
After the defeat at the Battle of Aegospotami, only the Samians remained loyal allies of the Athenians. The demos of the Samians expelled the oligarchs from their city and sent two envoys to Athens, offering their help anew so that the struggle could continue. In 404 BCE Lysander besieged and captured Samos, exiled the demos in turn, and restored the oligarchy.

After the restoration of democracy in Athens, the Athenians passed a decree in honor of the exiled Samian democrats. The decree is of great importance for understanding the events of the final years of the Peloponnesian War.

== Interpretation ==
The relief belongs to the class of decorative artworks that served as a supplementary or explanatory element on a decree stele. Athena represents the city of Athens, while Hera was the patron goddess of Samos. The symbolic handshake confirms the Athenians’ esteem for their loyal allies and attests to the alliance between the two cities.

== Historical placement ==
The relief carries three decrees. The first decree is dated to the archonship of Alexios in 405/404 BCE. The cutting of the three decrees and of the relief was carried out at the same time as the last two decrees, which are dated to the archonship of Eucleides in 403/402 BCE. The form of Hera may, according to Petersen and Collignon, derive from the Hera by Alkamenes.

== Bibliography ==
- Acropolis Museum. "Honorary decrees for the Samians." theacropolismuseum.gr.
- Εν Αθήναις Αρχαιολογική Εταιρεία (1906). Μνημεία της Ελλάδος. Athens: Τυπογραφείο Π. Δ. Σακελλαρίου. Internet Archive.
- Hicks, Edward Lee; Hill, Sir George Francis (1901). A Manual of Greek Historical Inscriptions. Oxford: Clarendon Press. Internet Archive.
- Trianti, Ismene (1998). Το Μουσείο Ακροπόλεως. Athens: OLKOS. p. 434. ISBN 960-7169-84-0. Archived from the original on 19 December 2014. Web Archive.
- Dickens, Guy (1921). Catalogue of the Acropolis Museum, Volume II: Sculpture and Architectural Fragments. Cambridge: University Press. pp. 234–237. Internet Archive.
- Attic Inscriptions Online. Cat. no. IG II² 1. atticinscriptions.com.
- Koumanoudis, N.; Mattheou, A. Ancient Greek Inscriptions. Athens, 1986, pp. 53–56, cat. no. 13 (verses 1–40).
- Kavvadias, P. “Issue of the month of July. Chapter II. Excavations and Finds.” Archaeological Bulletin D (1888), pp. 123–125, fig. 2.
- Kastriotis, P. Catalogue of the Acropolis Museum. Athens, 1895, p. 60, cat. no. 1333.
- Farnell, L. R. The Cults of the Greek States I. Oxford, 1896–1907, p. 351, fig. 21b.
- Arndt, P. Brunn-Bruckmann’s Denkmäler Griechischer und Römischer Sculptur. Munich, 1902, fig. 475a, cat. no. 475a.
- Matz, F. Die Naturpersonifikationen in der griechischen Kunst. Göttingen, 1913, pp. 56–57.
- Inscriptiones Graecae II², no. 1.
- Sylloge Inscriptionum Graecarum (tertium edita), pp. 158–162, cat. nos. 116, 117.
- Casson, S.; Brooke, D. Catalogue of the Acropolis Museum. Sculpture and Architectural Fragments, with a section upon the Terracottas II. Cambridge, 1921, pp. 234–237, cat. no. 1333. Internet Archive.
