= Erasinides =

Athenian military commander (died 406 BC)

Erasinides (Ancient Greek: Ἐρασινίδης; died 406 BC) was one of the ten commanders appointed to supersede Alcibiades after the Battle of Notium in 407 BCE.

According to the common reading in Xenophon, he and Leon of Salamis were with Conon when he was chased by Callicratidas to Mytilene. But we find Erasinides mentioned afterwards as one of the eight who commanded at Arginusae. Therefore, as classical scholars Morus and Schneider suggest, "Archestratus" must be substituted for both the above names in the passage of Xenophon, or we must suppose that Erasinides commanded the trireme which escaped to Athens with the news of Conon's blockade.

Erasinides was among the six generals who returned to Athens after the victory at Arginusae and were put to death in 406 BCE. Archedemus of Athens, in fact, took the first step against them by imposing a fine (Ancient Greek: ἐπιβολή) on Erasinides, and then calling him to account before a court of justice for retaining some public money which he had received in the Hellespont. On this charge, Erasinides was thrown into prison, and the success of the prosecution in the particular case paved the way to the more serious attack on the whole body of the generals.
