= Xanthias =

Stock character in Aristophanic comedy

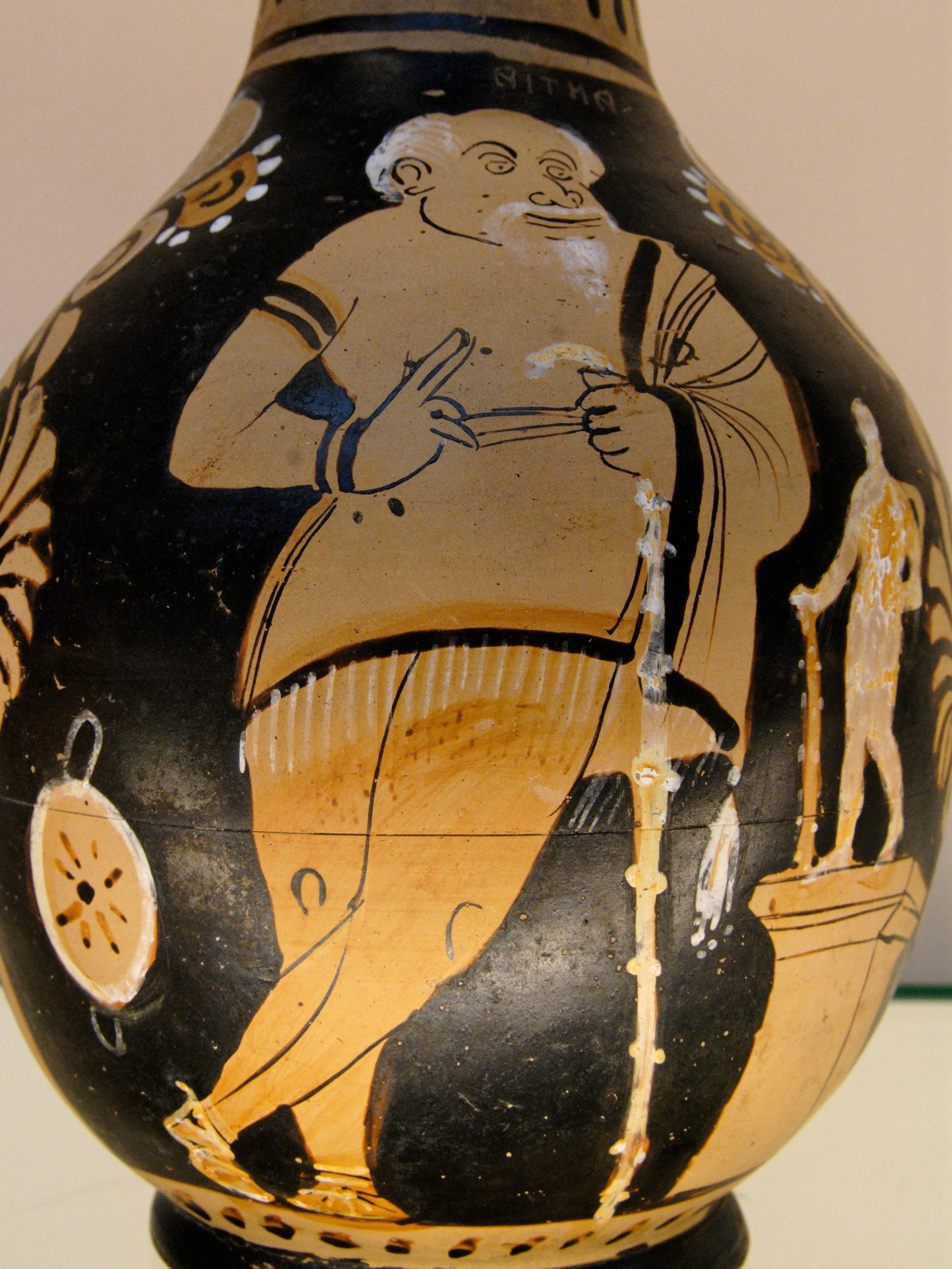
An actor dressed as Xanthias in The Frogs, standing next to a statuette of Heracles.

Xanthias refers to several characters, all slaves, who appear in plays by the Ancient Greek playwright Aristophanes.

== History ==
In The Frogs, Xanthias is the slave of Dionysus. He delivers the opening line of the play, riding on Dionysus' donkey and debating with Dionysus about what jokes Xanthias can make. He and Dionysus trade barbs throughout the play, with Xanthias generally coming out on top. When they cross the Acheron, Xanthias is forced to carry the luggage around the lake because he was unable to participate in the Battle of Arginusae, allegedly due to pinkeye. In the underworld, Xanthias is forced by Dionysus to trade attire three times, to comedic effect—when Dionysus is dressed as Heracles, he is threatened by Aeacus, the hostess, and an ornery maid, while Xanthias as Heracles is welcomed joyfully by a nice maid. Xanthias also manages to trick Aeacus into whipping both him and Dionysus to avoid having monsters set upon him. Once the confusion about master and slave is sorted out, Xanthias flirts with the nice maid, discussing ways they secretly rebel against their masters.

== Importance ==
Xanthias of The Frogs defies the convention of slaves introduced in earlier works by Aristophanes. In The Knights, The Wasps, and Peace, slaves fulfill two functions: they introduce the situation at the beginning of the play and they provide comedic relief by being threatened or frightened. However, in The Frogs, Xanthias begins by debating with his master about what kind of joke he can tell to initiate the play. Aristophanes uses their banter to blast the low level of humor used by contemporaries, referencing Phrynichus, Lykis, and Ameipsias. Aristophanes represents Xanthias as braver and cleverer than Dionysus. Xanthias pretends to see Empousa, frightening the bumbling, slouching Dionysus. Then Xanthias tricks Aeacus into whipping both of them to differentiate between master and servant. Xanthias is clearly dominant during the latter situation, as Dionysus pleads and whines to let Xanthias change clothes with him. Despite Xanthias' superiority, however, Dover cautions against an interpretation that Aristophanes supported emancipation—he points out that Aristophanes' audience may quite possibly have seen little more in Xanthias' dominance than a confirmation of the impudence of the servant class, and the comedy of the situation can arise from a reversal of roles, similar to the comedy evoked in Aristophanes' Lysistrata and Ecclesiazusae with regard to women. Brow-beating & topping a bumbling living god, Dionysus, during his multiple hallowed citations, may have had something to do with it, too.

=== Other appearances ===
- The Wasps, as Bdelycleon's slave
- The Clouds, as Strepsiades' slave
- The Birds, as a slave
- The Acharnians, as a slave ordered to hold phallus upright
