= Adeimantus (son of Leucolophides) =

5th-century BC Greek general

Adeimantus (/ˈædiːˌmæntəs/; Ancient Greek: Ἀδείμαντος), son of Leucolophides (Λευκολοφίδης) of the deme Scambonidae (Σκαμβονιδαι), was a friend of Alcibiades. His career closely paralleled that of his famous associate. His dates are undocumented, but he was probably born in the 450s BCE and lived at least to 393 BCE.

== Early life ==
The first we hear of Adeimantus is in Plato's Protagoras, where he is among those present at the house of Callias, son of Hipponicus, on a day in 433 to meet and talk with the visiting philosophers staying there. He does not speak, but listens in with several other young men, including Alcibiades and the sons of Pericles, while Socrates and Protagoras have an extended discussion about sophists and their teaching.

== Scandals of 415 and Exile ==
In the spring of 415, just before Athens was about to launch the disastrous expedition to Sicily, the city was rocked by two scandals. In the first, statues of Hermes scattered throughout the city were vandalized. Coming hard on the heels of this sacrilege, accusations were made against certain men for conducting mock celebrations of the Eleusinian Mysteries at various houses around the city. Adeimantus, along with Alcibiades, and Axiochus, was accused by Agariste, the wife of Alcaemonides, of doing so at the house of Charmides (Plato's uncle).

Alcibiades had been one of the three men elected to lead the expedition, and rather than delay it to fully investigate the charges, the city let him go for the time being. It is likely that Adeimantus went with him, since those who stayed in the city were summarily executed in the ensuing witch hunt.

After the expedition reached Sicily, word came that Alcibiades was commanded to return to Athens with the others named in the accusation. Rather than face trial, they jumped ship in Thurii and made their way to Sparta, after which the Athenians sentenced them to death.

Adeimantus’ property was later confiscated and sold at auction. The inventory and funds realized were inscribed on stelae and posted in the Agora.

== Return to Athens / Appointment as General ==
The next we hear of Adeimantus, he was commissioned as a general under Alcibiades after the latter's triumphant return to Athens in 407. According to Diodorus Sicilus:

[Alcibiades], after greeting the crowds kindly, called a meeting of the Assembly, and, offering a long defence of his conduct, he brought the masses into such a state of goodwill that all agreed that the city had been to blame for the decrees issued against him. Consequently they not only returned to him his property, which they had confiscated, but went further and cast into the sea the stelae on which were written his sentence and all the other acts passed against him; and they also voted that the Eumolpidae should revoke the curse they had pronounced against him at the time when men believed he had profaned the Mysteries. And to cap all they appointed him general with supreme power both on land and on sea and put in his hands all their armaments. They also chose as generals others whom he wished, namely, Adeimantus and Thrasybulus.

When Alcibiades left Athens in command of a fleet four months later, Adeimantus was with him. Within a short time, though, Alcibiades had, through neglect and bad judgment, incurred the wrath of the Athenians once again. Rather than return for whatever punishment they might mete out, he took a ship and some mercenaries and sailed to Thrace. Adeimantus apparently did not get caught up in this fiasco, for we find him the next year (406) assigned to replace the generals condemned after the sea battle at the Arginousae Islands for not rescuing sailors cast into the sea or recovering the bodies of those who had died in the battle.

He was still in theater when the Athenians chased the Spartan fleet into the Hellespont the next year. With the Spartans under Lysander holed up at Lampsacus, the Athenians set up camp across the water on the beach at Aegospotami. After several days of trying to draw the Spartans out of port where they could engage, Lysander caught the Athenians off guard with a rush across the channel. It was a rout, and the result was the deaths of many sailors, the loss of most of the fleet and the capture of several thousand prisoners. Conan, the lead general for Athens, managed to escape with 10 ships. Adeimantus and the other remaining generals were among those captured.

The Spartans and their allies were in a vindictive mood because of atrocities committed by Athenians in years past, and because of an Assembly vote to cut off the right hands of those they captured in war. After much discussion they voted to kill all the Athenian prisoners. Adeimantus alone was spared because he was known to have voted against the decree. However, in relating this event, Xenophon added the comment that he was charged by some with betraying the fleet.

== Reputation in Ruins ==
These suspicions lingered, but nothing was done about them until the year 393. Conon, who had sailed to Cyprus and taken up residence in the court of Evagoras, one of the kings on the island, finally returned to Athens in that year, after having destroyed the Spartan fleet with an armada assembled by the Persians. He got a hero's welcome and during the short time he was in the city brought a prosecution against Adeimantos for treason. His conviction is all but certain, given his reputation among later commentators. The orators Lysias and Demosthenes, as well as the later geographer Pausanias, all made reference to his complicity in the loss at Aegospotami.

A final note: His reputation had been tarnished well before Aegospotami. In the spring of 405, months before the battle, the comic poet Aristophanes lampooned him in Frogs:

So now, farewell, Aeschylus—go, save our city with your noble thoughts, and educate our fools—we have so many. Take this sword, hand it to Cleophon. Present this rope to tax collector Myrmex and his colleague Nicomachos—this hemlock give to Archenomos. Tell them to come here fast without delay. If they don’t come soon, then, by Apollo, I’ll brand and cripple them, then ship them down at full speed underground with Adeimantus, Leucolophos's son. [lines 1500-1512]

In the last line Aristophanes was punning on the father's name (Leucolophides) with the alteration “leuco” (white) “lophos” (crest, or nape of the neck), possibly implying being "under the yoke" and suggesting a reputation for following obediently after Alcibiades.
