= Archedemus of Athens =

5th-century BC Athenian politician

Archedemus or Archedamus (Ancient Greek: Άρχέδημος or Άρχέδαμος) was a popular leader in Athens, who took the first step against the generals who had gained the Battle of Arginusae in 406 BCE, by imposing a fine on Erasinides, and calling him to account in a court of justice for some public money which he had received in the Hellespont.

This seems to be the same Archedemus of whom Xenophon speaks in the Memorabilia, as originally poor, but of considerable talents both for speaking and detection, and who was employed by Crito of Alopece to protect him and his friends from the attacks of sycophants. It appears that Archedemus was a foreigner, and obtained the franchise by fraud, for which he was attacked by Aristophanes, and by Eupolis in his comedy Baptae.

Both Aristophanes and Lysias call him "blear-eyed" (Ancient Greek: γλάηων).
