= Aristogenes (general) =

Late 5th-century BC Greek general

Aristogenes (Ancient Greek: Ἀριστογένης) of Athens was an ancient Greek general during the Peloponnesian War, who was one of the ten commanders appointed to supersede Alcibiades after the battle of Notium in 407 BCE.

He was one of the eight who conquered Callicratidas at the Battle of Arginusae in 406 BCE; and Protomachus and himself, by not returning to Athens after the battle, escaped execution -- the fate of their six remaining colleagues -- though a sentence of condemnation was passed against them in their absence.
