= Callixenus =

Late 5th-century Athenian politician

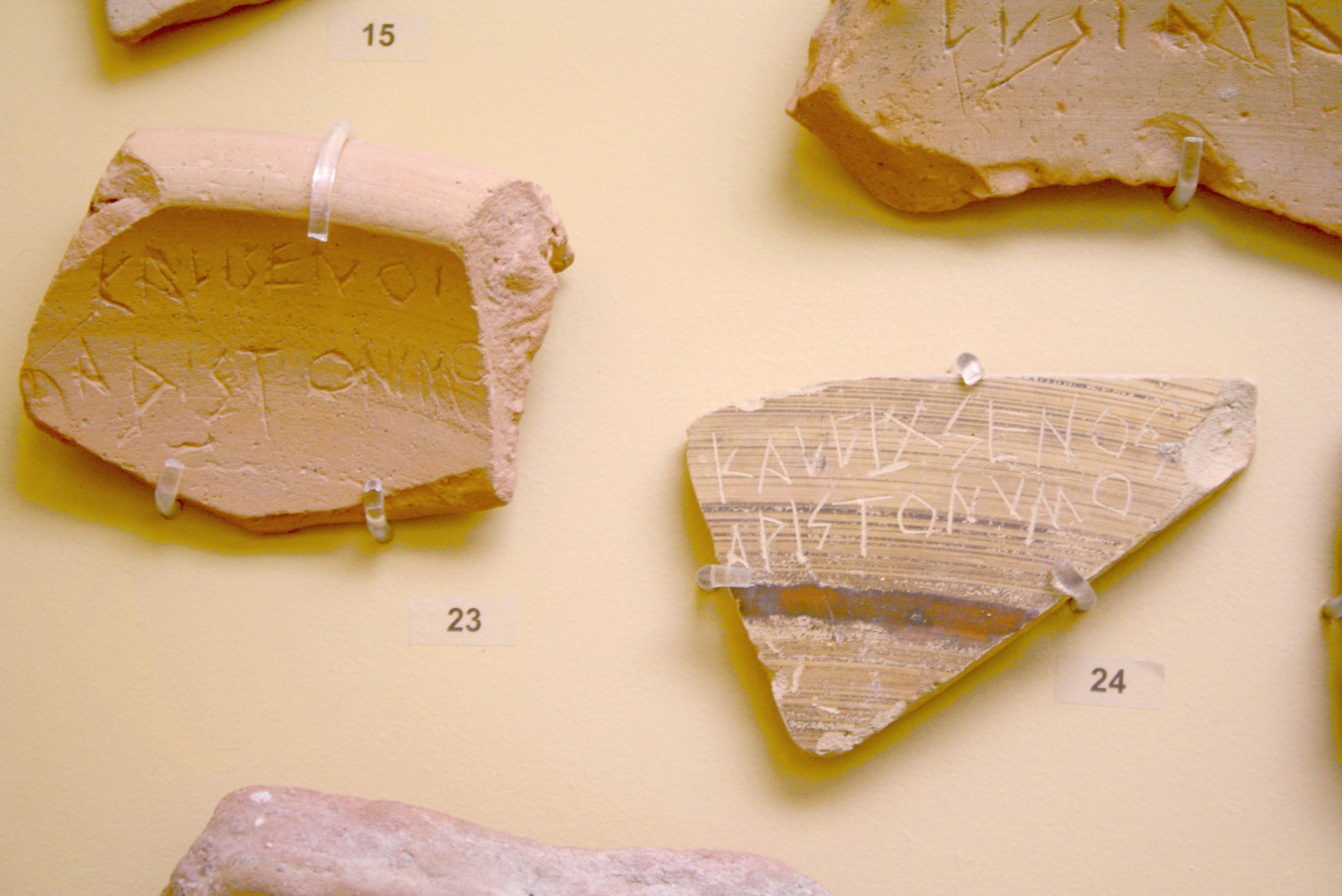
An ostrakon bearing the name of Callixenus, proposed for ostracism

Callixenus (Ancient Greek: Καλλίξενος) (fl. 406 BC – 400 BC) was an Athenian politician who lived around the time of Socrates. After the Battle of Arginusae, Callixenus argued that the generals who failed to rescue Athenian shipwreck victims should be tried together by the Assembly. Euryptolemus brought a suit (graphe paranomon) against Callixenus claiming that the proposal was unlawful, but was forced to drop it in the face of public opinion. At the trial, the remaining generals – two, Aristogenes and Protomachus, had already fled Athens rather than face trial – were found guilty, and sentenced to death. A later rhetorical work by Aelius Aristides claims that Callixenus also proposed that the generals should not be buried, though this is certainly ahistorical.

As public opinion turned against the motion brought by Callixenus, a case was brought against him and he fled Athens. He returned in the general amnesty of 403, and died in Athens of starvation.
