= Aristocrates (son of Scellias) =

Late 5th century BCE Greek politician and commander

Aristocrates (Ancient Greek: Ἀριστοκράτης; died 406 BC) was an ancient Athenian of wealth and influence, the son of Scellias, who attached himself to the oligarchical party that attained power in the anti-democratic coup in 411 BCE, and was a member of its government, the Four Hundred. Despite this, Aristocrates was, with Theramenes, also the main instrument in overthrowing this body. The playwright Aristophanes refers to him in his play The Birds with a punning allusion to his name and politics.

In 407, when Alcibiades, on his return to Athens, was made commander-in-chief, Aristocrates and Adeimantus were elected generals of the land forces under him. In the same year, Aristocrates was appointed one of the ten commanders who superseded Alcibiades, and he was among the six who were brought to trial and executed after the Battle of Arginusae in 406 BCE.
