= Mothax =

Spartan class

Mothax (Ancient Greek: μόθαξ, mothax, pl.: μόθακες, mothakes) is a Doric Greek word meaning "stepbrother".

The term was used for a sociopolitical class in ancient Sparta, particularly during the Peloponnesian War (431–404 BC). The mothakes were primarily either offspring of Spartiate fathers and helot mothers or children of impoverished Spartiates. Mothakes were not able to contribute to the syssitia, the core civic daily institution for citizens, and thus were not allowed to maintain an "equal" status. They were, however, permitted to fight as troops along with perioeci.

Though free, they were not Spartan citizens but were brought up alongside Spartan boys as their foster brothers. Due to the expenses of providing extra mess contributions, their rearing was usually sponsored by wealthy families. Some mothakes such as Gylippus, Lysander and Callicratidas rose to prominence; Gylippus's father exiled for treason and Lysander raised in poverty.
