= Cleandridas =

5th century BCE Spartan general

- Κλεανδρίδας or Κλεανδρίδης
- Born: 5th century BCE
- Died: Unknown (sentenced to death in absentia)
- Occupations: General, military advisor
- Era: Classical Greece
- Known for: Advisor to King Pleistoanax; alleged bribery scandal with Pericles; father of Gylippus
- Children: Gylippus

Cleandridas or Cleandrides (Greek: Κλεανδρίδας or Κλεανδρίδης) was a Spartan general of the 5th century BCE, who advised the young Agiad king Pleistoanax during the early part of the latter's reign. According to Plutarch, both Cleandrides and Pleistoanax were banished from Sparta (most likely between the years 446 and 444 BC), for allegedly accepting a bribe from the Athenian leader Pericles to call off their planned attack on the Athenian region Attica. Although Pleistoanax was later recalled to Sparta, Cleandrides had a death sentence imposed upon him in his absence (Plutarch, Life of Pericles XXII).

Nevertheless, Cleandridas was described as a shrewd general and strategist. The 2nd century AD writer Polyaenus described how Cleandridas skillfully sowed dissent among his enemies, the people of Tegea, by promoting the false appearance that their leaders had accepted bribes from Sparta.

Cleandridas was the father of Spartan general Gylippus, who defeated the Athenians in Sicily.
