= Stesicles =

Stesicles was an Athenian general sent in 373 BC with a force of some 600 targeteers to aid the democratic party at Corcyra against the Spartans under Mnasippus. A more effective armament of 60 ships, with Timotheus for commander, was to follow as soon as it could be got ready. Meanwhile, Stesicles, with the assistance of Alcetas I of Epirus, effected an entrance into the town under cover of night. Here he reconciled the dissensions of the democratic party, united them against the common enemy, and conducted that series of successful operations, which ended in the defeat and death of Mnasippus, and the withdrawal of the Spartan fleet even before the arrival of Iphicrates, who had superseded Timotheus. There can be no question as to the identity of the Stesicles of Xenophon with the Ctesicles of Diodorus. But the latter writer tells us that Ctesicles had been sent sometime before to Zacynthus, to take the command against the Spartans of the Zacynthian exiles, whom Timotheus had restored. Johann Gottlob Schneider would reconcile the two authors by supposing that he was ordered to proceed from Zacynthus to Corcyra, nor does this seem so inconsistent with the language of Xenophon as Connop Thirlwall and Carl Rehdantz represent it.
