= Gylippus =

5th-century BC Spartan general

Gylippus (/dʒɪˈlɪpəs/; Greek: Γύλιππος) was a Spartan general (strategos) of the 5th century BC; he was the son of Cleandridas, who was the adviser of King Pleistoanax and had been expelled from Sparta for accepting Athenian bribes in 446 BC and fled to Thurii, a pan-Hellenic colony then being founded in the instep of Italy with Athenian help and participation. His mother may have been a helot, which meant he was not a true Spartiate but a mothax, a man of inferior status. Despite this, from an early childhood he was trained for war in the traditional Spartan fashion and on reaching maturity had been elected to a military mess, his dues contributed by a wealthier Spartiate patron. For an individual of marginal origins, war was an opportunity to gain honor and eminence.

When Alcibiades urged the Spartans to send a general to lead the Syracusan resistance against the Athenian expedition, Gylippus was appointed (414 BC), his arrival was a turning point of the struggle. More daring than Nicias, the Athenian commander he faced, he was able to gain an upper hand by driving the Athenians from key strategic locations and essentially breaking the siege. When Athens sent Demosthenes with reinforcements, he too was defeated by Gylippus, which ultimately led to the downfall of the Athenian campaign in Syracuse.

Diodorus, probably following Timaeus, represents him as inducing the Syracusans to pass sentence of death on the captive Athenian generals, but there is also the statement of Philistus (Plutarch, Nicias, 28), a Syracusan who himself took part in the defence, and Thucydides (vii. 86), that he tried, though without success, to save their lives, wishing to take them to Sparta as a signal proof of his success.

Gylippus, like his father, met his downfall in a financial scandal; entrusted by Lysander with a treasure of silver coins for delivery to the ephors at Sparta, he could not resist the temptation to embezzle part of the shipment. Upon discovery of this theft, Gylippus fled Sparta and went into exile. He was condemned to death in absentia and disappears from historical records.

== General and cited references ==
Attirbution

- This work in turn cites:
  - Thucydides vi. 93, 104, vii.
  - Plutarch, Nicias, 19, 21, 27, 28, Lysander, 16, 17
  - Diodorus xiii. 7, 8, 28–32
  - Polyaenus i. 39, 42
