= Protomachus (Athenian general) =

Late 5th-century BC Athenian admiral

Protomachus (Ancient Greek: Πρωτόμαχος) was an Athenian general during the Peloponnesian War. When the Athenians got the news about the Battle of Notium, they were angry with Alcibiades, thinking that he had lost the ships through neglect of duty and dissolute conduct, and they chose ten new generals, including the Protomachus.

During the naval Battle of Arginusae, the right wing of the Athenian fleet was under his command, with fifteen ships. Beside Protomachus was Thrasyllus with fifteen ships. Lysias was behind Protomachus with fifteen ships.

Protomachus was one of the eight generals who were deposed from their office and ordered to return to Athens to stand trial because they failed to rescue the sailors after the battle. But he, along with Aristogenes, deserted and did not return to Athens.
