= Aracus (navarch) =

Spartan military commander, 5th/4th-century BC

Aracus (Ancient Greek: Ἄρακος Arakos; fl. 409–369 BC) was a Spartan military commander and statesman. He served as ephor in 409/8 BC, and seems to have been a supporter of the foreign policy championed by Lysander during the Peloponnesian War. In 406 BC, Aracus received the nominal command (navarchy) of the Spartan fleet, with Lysander as his secretary (epistoleus) or deputy. Lysander held the actual command of the fleet, and had only been assigned a position subordinate to Aracus because Spartan law did not allow the same man to hold the office of navarch twice.

In 398 BC, Aracus led a commission to inspect Sparta's conquests in Asia Minor, to prolong the command of Dercylidas, and to negotiate with the Achaemenid king Artaxerxes II, though his mission failed completely. In 369 BC, he was one of the ambassadors sent to Athens, at which he had greater success.
