= Mnasippus =

Mnasippus of Sparta (Ancient Greek: Μνάσιππος) was appointed to the command of the armament which was sent to Corcyra, in 373 BC, to recover the island from the Athenians. Having landed there, he ravaged the country, and, blockading the city by sea and land, reduced the Corcyraeans to the greatest extremities. Imagining, however, that success was now within his grasp, he dismissed some of his mercenaries and kept the pay of the rest in arrear. It would appear, too, that discipline was less strictly preserved among his men than heretofore, for we read that the several posts of the besiegers were now imperfectly guarded, and that their soldiers were dispersed in straggling parties throughout the country. The Corcyraeans, observing this, made a sally, in which they slew some, and made some prisoners. Mnasippus proceeded in haste against them, ordering his officers to lead out the mercenaries and, when they represented to him that they could not answer for the obedience of the men while they remained unpaid, he met their remonstrances with blows – an exhibition of coarse arrogance by no means uncommon with Spartans in power. It may well be conceived that the spirit which animated his troops was not one of alacrity or of attachment to his person. In the battle which ensued close to the gates of the town, the Corcyraeans were victorious and Mnasippus was slain. According to Diodorus, these successful operations were conducted under the command of Ctesicles (doubtless the Stesicles of Xenophon), whom the Athenians had sent to the aid of Corcyra with a body of 500 or 600 targeteers.
