= Conon =

5th/4th-century BCE Athenian statesman and general

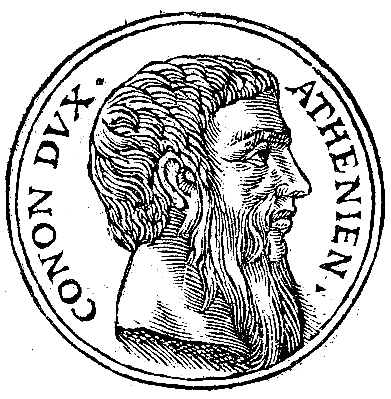
Conon from Promptuarii Iconum Insigniorum

Conon (Greek: Κόνων) (before 443 BC – c. 389 BC) was an Athenian general at the end of the Peloponnesian War, who led the Athenian naval forces when they were defeated by a Peloponnesian fleet in the crucial Battle of Aegospotami; later he contributed significantly to the restoration of Athens' political and military power.

== Commanding the Athenian fleet ==
Shortly after the Battle of Notium, Conon took over command of the Athenian fleet from Alcibiades, who had fled to Thrace. When the new Spartan navarch (commander-in-chief of the fleet) Callicratidas took over command from Lysander, he started an aggressive campaign against the Athenians in the Aegean. After taking Methymna in Lesbos, he sent a message to Conon, declaring that he would put an end to Conon's command of the sea. Soon thereafter, Callicratidas caught Conon's fleet of seventy ships at sea and pursued him towards Mytilene Harbor on Lesbos, where in the ensuing battle, Conon lost thirty ships. Conon drew the remaining forty ships up onto the beach, but while blockading him from sea, Callicratidas also surrounded him on land, having transported land forces from Chios and gaining the aid of the Methymnaeans.

Besieged by land and sea, Conon was unable to break out from the vastly superior forces that surrounded him and only barely slipped a messenger ship out to Athens. After some initial panic, Athens sent a sizable force sent out to raise the siege. Callicraditas met this force at the Battle of Arginusae. His force was soundly defeated, and Callicratidas himself was killed. After his death, Lysander returned from Sparta to take command of Sparta's naval efforts in the Aegean.

== Defeat at Aegospotami ==
Conon had been sent out to lead the Athenian forces following the recall of Alcibiades in 406 BC and, in 405 BC pursued the Peloponnesian fleet under Lysander to the Hellespont. Once there, the Peloponnesian took up a strong defensive position at Lampsacus and as they could not lure them out, the Athenians retreated to Aegospotami. Alcibiades came to warn them of the danger of their position, as they were based on an open beach without harbours, and advised them to move to Sestos about two miles away from where they were retrieving supplies. It seems that Alcibiades' advice was ignored and perhaps ridiculed.

On the fifth day of the standoff, Lysander sent out scouts to spy on the Athenians. They signalled the main army once the Athenian crews had disembarked to take their meals. Thus, when Lysander attacked almost the entire Athenian navy was caught unprepared and captured without resistance, and all the men taken were put to death. It was generally believed that some kind of treachery was involved, but Conon himself was never implicated. His ship was one of nine which escaped the disaster, boldly rushing to Lampsacus where the Spartans had left their fleet's sails (as was typical before a naval battle) and so preventing any effective means of pursuit. One of the nine Athenian ships to escape, the Paralus, returned to Athens, while Conon, with the other eight ships, fled to Evagoras of Cyprus, fearing the judgement of the Athenian people.

== Aftermath and later career ==
As a result of this victory, Sparta defeated the Athenians and so attempted to carve out her own empire in the Aegean. Her relationship with Persia deteriorated, and she began raiding the satrapies of Pharnabazus and Tissaphernes in Anatolia. By 397 BC, Pharnabazus had persuaded the Persian king Artaxerxes to prosecute the war by sea, and raised a fleet of 300 Phoenician and Cypriot ships. In sheer numbers they would be overwhelming, but they needed an experienced commander, and so they found Conon at Cyprus, who was only too happy for a chance to take revenge upon the Peloponnesians.

First Conon moved up to Caria with a small portion of the fleet, where he was for a time blocked but then rescued by Pharnabazus and Tissaphernes. He then proceeded to Rhodes, where the pro-Spartan oligarchy was replaced by a democracy, and managed to capture food supplies being sent up from Egypt. In response to this, the Spartans decided to send out their navy, but made the mistake of entrusting it to Peisander, who had no experience. The battle took place at Cnidus in 394 BC, and was an easy and overwhelming Persian success. The Aegean cities expelled the Spartan garrisons and accepted Persian rule.

After this success, Conon felt it was safe for him to return to Athens. Pharnabazus allowed him to retain part of the fleet, and supplied money for the fortification of Piraeus and the reconstruction of the long walls joining it to Athens. These actions meant that some of the main results of the Peloponnesian War were undone - Athens regained her position as a major power in Greece, and though she had still lost her empire, Sparta had been prevented from taking it over.

The next year the Spartans had opened negotiations with the Persians, and in order to secure their position in Greece offered to hand over all the cities in Anatolia to them. The Athenians sent delegates (including Conon) to announce this as unacceptable, which Tiribazus understood to mean that they still hoped to recover their empire and, outraged by this about-face, threw them in prison, Conon among them. Ancient writers give conflicting accounts of his end: some claim that he was sent into the interior of Asia and put to death; other accounts, probably more likely, record that he retired to Cyprus and died there. His son Timotheus later became another prominent general.
