= Battle of Notium =

Naval battle during Peloponnesian War (406 BC)

- Part of the Peloponnesian War
Date	406 BC
Location	Near Ephesus and Notium (modern-day İzmir, Turkey) 37°59′34″N 26°50′51″E
Result	Spartan victory

Belligerents
Sparta	Athens

Commanders and leaders
Lysander	Antiochus †

Strength
90 ships	80 ships

Casualties and losses
No Casualties	22 ships (15 captured, 7 sunk)
- Location of the Battle of Notium.

The Battle of Notium (or Battle of Ephesus) in 406 BC was a Spartan naval victory in the Peloponnesian War. Prior to the battle, the Athenian commander, Alcibiades, left his helmsman, Antiochus, in command of the Athenian fleet, which was blockading the Spartan fleet in Ephesus. In violation of his orders, Antiochus attempted to draw the Spartans into battle by tempting them with a small decoy force. His strategy backfired, and the Spartans under Lysander scored a small but symbolically significant victory over the Athenian fleet. This victory resulted in the downfall of Alcibiades, and established Lysander as a commander who could defeat the Athenians at sea.

== Prelude ==
In 407 BC, Lysander was appointed as navarch, commander of the Spartan fleet, replacing the deceased Mindarus. Gathering a fleet as he went, he sailed east across the Aegean from the Peloponnese and eventually reached Ephesus, where he established his base, with 70 triremes, which he increased to 90 through shipbuilding efforts at Ephesus. In Ephesus, he established diplomatic relations with Cyrus, a Persian prince. Lysander built a personal friendship with Cyrus, and the prince agreed to provide funds out of his own purse to increase the pay of Spartan rowers to 4 obols a day from 3. With this increased funding, the Spartan fleet could attract experienced rowers from the Athenian fleet.

Alcibiades, needing to force a battle with Lysander, brought his fleet to Notium, where he could closely watch the Spartan fleet across the water. Merely sitting at Notium, however, failed to bring Lysander out to fight. Accordingly, Alcibiades sailed north with a few troopships to assist Thrasybulus in the siege of Phocaea. The bulk of the fleet, which remained behind him, was placed under the command of Alcibiades' kybernetes, or helmsman. A fleet of this size (80 ships remained at Notium after Alcibiades' departure) would traditionally have been commanded by several generals, or at the least by a trierarch; Alcibiades' unconventional decision has been widely criticized by both ancient and modern authors. Antiochus was given one simple order to govern his actions; "Do not attack Lysander's ships." For some reason, he chose not to obey this order, and attempted to implement a stratagem that he thought would give the Athenians a victory.

== Battle ==
Seeking to draw the Spartans out to fight, Antiochus sailed out towards Ephesus with 10 triremes. His plan was to draw the Peloponnesians out in pursuit of his small force, after which the rest of the Athenian force would ambush them. This plan was very similar to that which had produced the stunning Athenian victory at Cyzicus, but conditions at Notium were utterly different from those at that battle. In practice, Antiochus' ship was sunk, and he was killed, by a sudden Spartan attack; the remaining nine ships of the decoy force were then chased headlong back toward Notium, where the main Athenian force was caught unprepared by the sudden arrival of the whole Spartan fleet. In the ensuing fighting, 15 Athenian triremes were captured and seven more were sunk. The Spartans sailed back to Ephesus, having won an unexpected victory, while the Athenians returned to Notium to regroup.

== Aftermath ==
Upon receiving news of the battle, Alcibiades lifted the siege of Phocaea and returned south to reinforce the fleet at Notium; this restored rough numerical parity between the two fleets. Further attempts to draw Lysander out into a battle proved unsuccessful, however, and the two fleets continued to watch each other across the water.

The defeat at Notium caused the complete downfall of Alcibiades in Athenian politics. Restored to favor after the victory at Cyzicus, he had been placed in command with great expectations. When his unorthodox appointment of Antiochus led to a messy defeat, his political enemies saw their chance, and he was removed from office. Never again returning to Athens, he sailed north to land he owned in the Thracian Chersonese; except for a brief appearance at Aegospotami, his involvement in the war was over.

The commands of both fleets changed hands after Notium. Because of term limits on the position of navarch, Lysander was replaced by Callicratidas; on the Athenian side, the fall of Alcibiades also brought down his friends Thrasybulus and Theramenes, and the overall command was given to Conon. Over the next year, the fleets clashed twice, first in a battle where, with twice as many ships as Conon, Callicratidas defeated the Athenians and trapped them in Mytilene; an Athenian relief fleet then decisively defeated and killed Callicratidas at Arginusae. These Athenian victories proved useless, however, for in 405 BC Lysander returned to unofficial command and destroyed the Athenian fleet at Aegospotami, thus ending the Peloponnesian War with Sparta the victor.

Notium, although not terribly significant in the number of ships won or lost by either side (the gains made by the Spartan fleet were more than erased by their defeat at Arginusae), had the significant effect of launching the career of Lysander and ending that of Alcibiades. Lysander would go on to end the Athenian empire and contend for several years for control of the Spartan empire that replaced it; Alcibiades, meanwhile, would be assassinated in 403 BC, having never returned to his native city. Donald Kagan, meanwhile, has suggested that the most important effect of the battle on the Athenian side was the removal from command of Thrasybulus, the talented commander who had helped plan all the Athenian naval victories of 411 and 410 BC.

Notium, then, although not decisive in itself, had large political ramifications, and played a significant role in determining who would lead the forces of Athens and Sparta in the upcoming decisive battles of the war.
