= Cleophon (politician) =

Athenian politician (died 405 BC)

Cleophon (Greek: Kλεoφῶν, Kleophōn; died 405 BC) was an Athenian politician and demagogue, who was very influential during the Peloponnesian War. He was a staunch democrat and vehement opponent of the oligarchs; his sparring with Critias rated a mention in Aristotle's Rhetoric.

On three occasions, he inspired the citizens of Athens to reject the Spartans' attempts to make peace; once after the Athenian victory at Cyzicus (410 BC), again after the Athenian victory at Arginusae (406 BC), and once again after the decisive Spartan naval victory at Aegospotami (405 BC). During Lysander's ensuing siege, the tide of opinion turned against the democrats, and the oligarchs used the opportunity to rid themselves of their rival. One of their members, Satyrus, brought a charge against Cleophon of neglect of military duty, leading to his arrest. Since it was by no means certain that Cleophon could be convicted of this, the commissioner for the publication of the Athenian laws, Nicomachus, was persuaded by bribery or partisanship to exhibit a "law" allowing the oligarch-dominated Boule to oversee Cleophon's trial by lot-chosen jury. The oligarchs used this assessorship (συνδικάζειν) over the jurors to ensure the conviction of Cleophon and his death sentence.

Cleophon was made the object of satire by the comic poet Plato in an eponymous play (now lost), and by Aristophanes in The Frogs. Both made fun of Cleophon's Thracian origins and accent: since his father is known to have been an Athenian citizen, his mother is conjectured to have been Thracian. Plato mocked his low Athenian birth, (Andocides says that Cleophon was a harp-maker by trade, and Aelian comments on the poverty of his early life).
