= Battle of Aegospotami =

Naval battle in the Peloponnesian War

- Part of the Peloponnesian War
Date	405 BC
Location	Aegospotami, Hellespont (present-day Çanakkale Province, Turkey) 40°15′N 26°33′E
Result	Spartan victory
Territorial changes	Athens is besieged and surrenders; End of the Peloponnesian War

Belligerents
Sparta; Corinth; Peloponnesian League	Athens; Delian League

Commanders and leaders
Lysander; Aracus; Cleomedes of Samos	Conon; Philocles; Adeimantus

Strength
170 ships	180 ships 36,000 men

Casualties and losses
Minimal	160 ships, 3,000 sailors executed
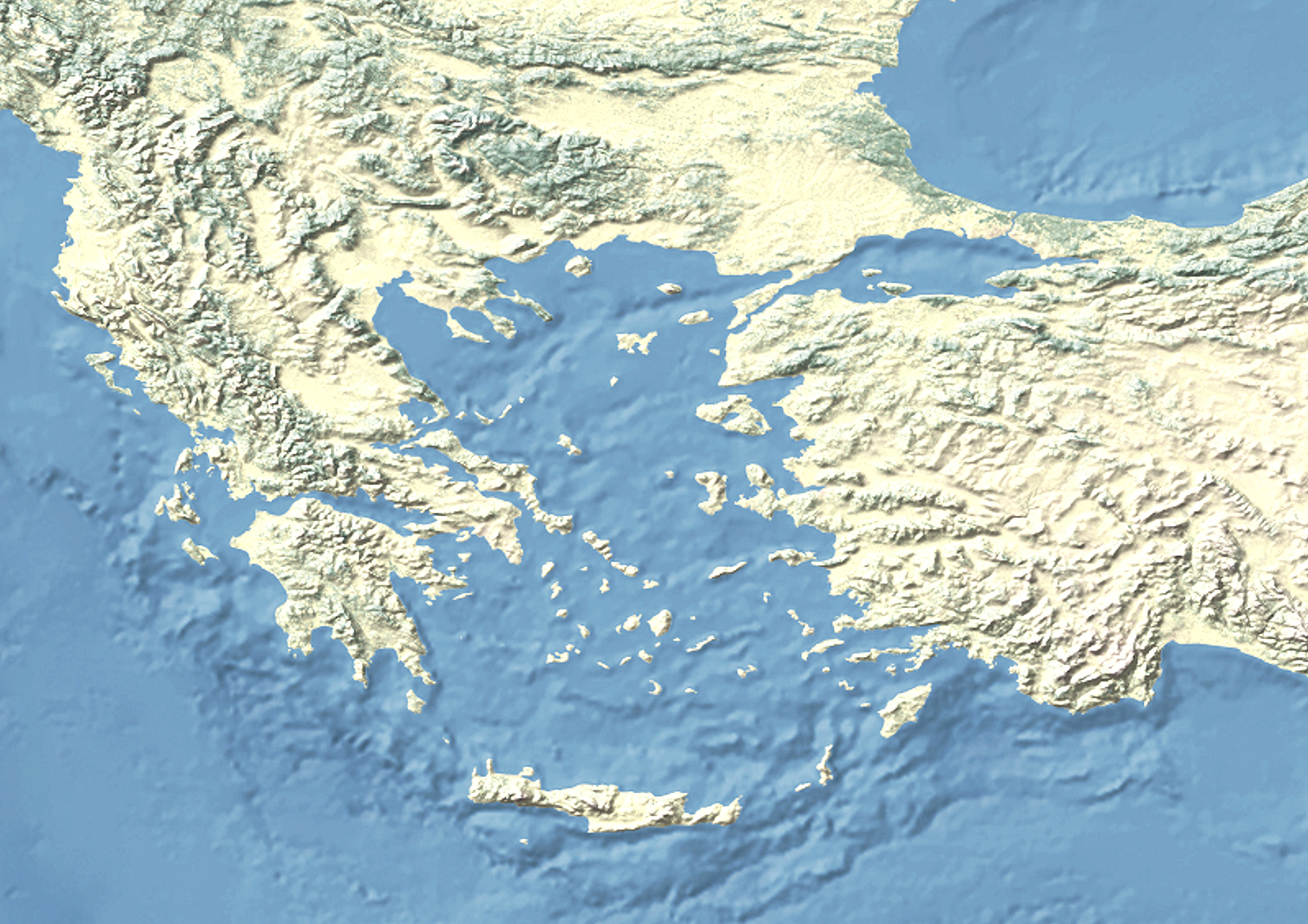
- Location of the Battle of Aegospotami

The Battle of Aegospotami (Greek: Μάχη στους Αιγός Ποταμούς) was a naval confrontation that took place in 405 BC and was the last major battle of the Peloponnesian War. In the battle, a Spartan fleet under Lysander destroyed the Athenian navy. This effectively ended the war, since Athens could not import grain or communicate with its empire without control of the sea.

== Prelude ==
=== Lysander's campaigns ===
In 405 BC, following the severe Spartan defeat at the Battle of Arginusae, Lysander, the commander who had been responsible for the first Spartan naval successes, was reinstated in command. Since the Spartan constitution prohibited any commander from holding the office of navarch more than once, he was appointed as a vice-admiral instead, with the clear understanding that this was a mere legal fiction.

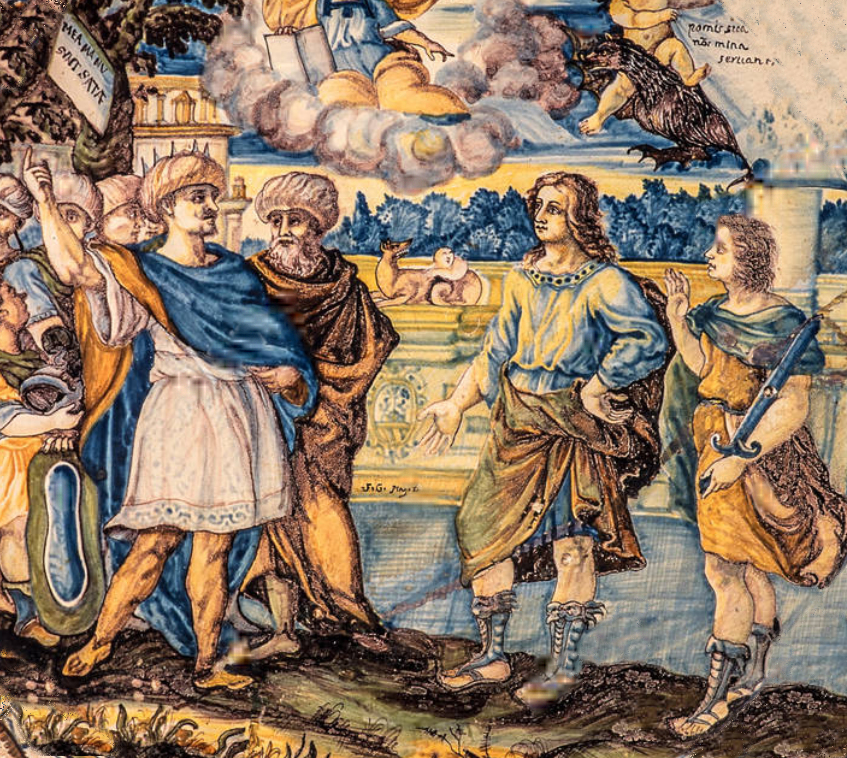
Meeting between Cyrus the Younger and Lysander, by Francesco Antonio Grue (1618–1673).

One of Lysander's advantages as a commander was his close relationship with the Persian prince Cyrus. Using this connection, he quickly raised the money to begin rebuilding the Spartan fleet. When Cyrus was recalled to Susa by his father Darius, he gave Lysander the revenues from all of his cities of Asia Minor. With the resources of this entire wealthy Persian province at his disposal, Lysander was able to quickly reconstitute his fleet.

He then set off on a series of campaigns throughout the Aegean. He seized several Athenian-held cities, and attacked numerous islands. He was unable to move north to the Hellespont, however, because of the threat from the Athenian fleet at Samos. To divert the Athenians, Lysander struck westward. Approaching quite near to Athens itself, he attacked Aegina and Salamis, and even landed in Attica. The Athenian fleet set out in pursuit, but Lysander sailed around them, reached the Hellespont, and established a base at Abydos. From there, he seized the strategically important town of Lampsacus, opening the way to the Bosporus. Should he reach the strait, he could close down the trade routes from which Athens received the majority of her grain. If the Athenians were to avoid starvation, Lysander had to be contained immediately.

=== Athenian response ===
The Athenian fleet of 180 ships caught up with Lysander shortly after he had taken Lampsacus, and established a base at Sestos. However, perhaps because of the need to keep a close watch on Lysander, they set up camp on a beach much nearer to Lampsacus. The location was less than ideal because of the lack of a harbor and the difficulty of supplying the fleet, but proximity seems to have been the primary concern in the minds of the Athenian generals. Every day, the fleet sailed out to Lampsacus in battle formation, and waited outside the harbor; when Lysander refused to emerge, they returned home.

=== Alcibiades's involvement ===
At this time, the exiled Athenian leader Alcibiades was living in his ship's castle near the Athenian camp. Coming down to the beach where the ships were gathered, he made several suggestions to the generals. First, he proposed relocating the fleet to the more secure base at Sestos. Second, he claimed that several Thracian kings had offered to provide him with an army. If the generals would offer him a share of the command, he claimed, he would use this army to assist the Athenians. The generals, however, declined this offer and rejected his advice. Spurned, Alcibiades returned to his home.

== Battle ==
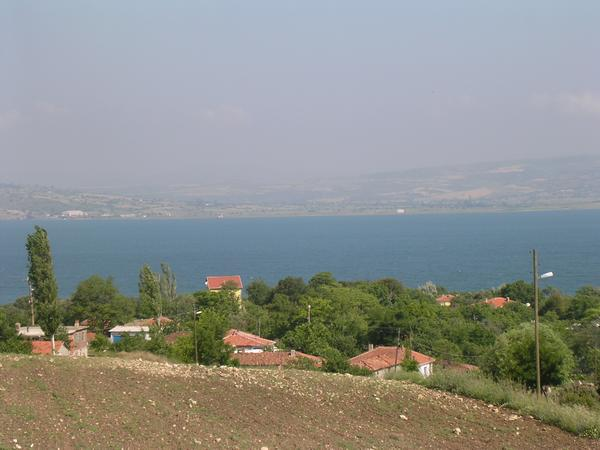
View across the Hellespont to Aegospotami.

Two accounts of the battle of Aegospotami exist. Diodorus Siculus relates that the Athenian general in command on the fifth day at Sestos, Philocles, sailed out with thirty ships, ordering the rest to follow him. Donald Kagan has argued that the Athenian strategy, if this account is accurate, must have been to draw the Peloponnesians into an attack on the small force so that the larger force following could surprise them. In the event, the small force was immediately defeated, and the remainder of the fleet was caught unprepared on the beach.

Xenophon, in contrast, relates that the entire Athenian fleet came out as usual on the day of the battle and Lysander remained in the harbor. When the Athenians returned to their camp, the sailors scattered to forage for food; Lysander's fleet then sailed across from Abydos and captured most of the ships on the beach, with no sea fighting at all.

Whichever account of the battle itself is accurate, the result is clear. The Athenian fleet was obliterated; only nine ships escaped, led by the general Conon. Lysander captured nearly all of the remainder, along with some three or four thousand Athenian sailors. One of the escaped ships, the messenger ship Paralus, was dispatched to inform Athens of the disaster. The rest, with Conon, sought refuge with Evagoras, a friendly ruler in Cyprus.

Some historians, ancient and modern, suspect that the battle was lost as the result of treachery, perhaps on the part of Adeimantus, who was the only Athenian commander the Spartans captured during the battle who was not put to death, and perhaps with the treasonous connivance of the oligarchical faction at Athens, who may have wanted their city defeated in order to overthrow the democracy. But this all remains speculative.

== Aftermath ==
Lysander and his victorious fleet sailed back to Lampsacus. Citing a previous Athenian atrocity when the captured sailors of two ships were thrown overboard, Lysander and his allies slaughtered Philocles and 3,000 Athenian prisoners, sparing other Greek captives. Lysander's fleet then began moving slowly towards Athens, capturing cities along the way. The Athenians, with no fleet, were powerless to oppose him. Only at Samos did Lysander meet resistance; the democratic government there, fiercely loyal to Athens, refused to give in, and Lysander left a besieging force behind him.

Xenophon reports that when the news of the defeat reached Athens,

...a sound of wailing ran from Piraeus through the long walls to the city, one man passing on the news to another; and during that night no one slept, all mourning, not for the lost alone, but far more for their own selves.

Fearing the retribution that the victorious Spartans might take on them, the Athenians resolved to hold out from the siege, but their cause was hopeless. Without a fleet to import grain from the Black Sea, and with the Spartan occupation of Deceleia cutting off land transportation, the Athenians were beginning to starve, and with people dying of hunger in the streets, the city surrendered in March 404 BC. The walls of the city were demolished, and a pro-Spartan oligarchic government was established (the so-called Thirty Tyrants' regime). The Spartan victory at Aegospotami marked the end of 27 years of war, placing Sparta in a position of complete dominance throughout the Greek world and establishing a political order that would last for more than thirty years.

== Commemoration of the battle ==
The Spartans commemorated their victory with a dedication at Delphi of statues of the trierarchs who had fought in the battle. A verse inscription explained the circumstances:

These men, sailing with Lysander in the swift ships, humbled the might of the city of Cecrops
And made Lacedaemon of the beautiful choruses the high city of Hellas.
