= Callicratidas =

5th-century BC Spartan admiral

- Καλλικρατίδας
- Born: c. 450 BC
- Died: 406 BC; Aegean Sea
- Military career
- Allegiance: Lacedaemon
- Service years: 406 - 406 BC
- Rank: Navarch
- Conflicts: Battle of Mytilene; Battle of Arginusae †

Callicratidas (Greek: Καλλικρατίδας) was a Spartan navarch during the Peloponnesian War. He belonged to the non-citizen mothax class, yet despite his disfavored background he rose to prominence. In 406 BC, he was sent to the Aegean to take command of the Spartan fleet from the navarch Lysander.

== Biography ==
Callicratidas's tenure as navarch was short, and he encountered a number of difficulties. Chief among these were the intrigues of his predecessor, who had apparently returned the money from which the fleet was supposed to be paid for to its source, the Persian prince Cyrus. Callicratidas needed money from Cyrus to pay his men, but, as a traditionalist Spartan, he was loath to request it from a Persian. His halfhearted attempts to secure funding from Cyrus fell through, and he was forced to find an alternative source of funds, which the city of Miletus eventually provided.

After winning an initial victory against the Athenian admiral Conon at Mytilene, Callicratidas came up against a sizable Athenian force sent out to relieve Conon. He met this force at the Battle of Arginusae in 406 BC. His force was soundly defeated, and Callicratidas himself was killed. After his death, Lysander returned from Sparta to take command of Sparta's naval efforts in the Aegean.

Callicratidas is remembered as a Spartan of the old school. He disdained the policy of alliance with Persia that had come into favor under Lysander, and he stated that if the choice were his, he would seek peace with Athens. The increasing role of money in Spartan politics and diplomacy offended his traditionalist, antimaterialist sensibilities. Although unsuccessful in his command, he won the respect of many Spartans and allies, and was well regarded after his death.

== Pseudo-Callicratidas ==
Callicratidas is not to be confused with Pseudo-Callicratidas, the pseudonymous author of the Neo-Pythagorean treatise On the Felicity of Families. The treatise puts forward the idea that remarked that a wife's wealth may thwart her husband's rule.
