= Battle of Arginusae =

Naval battle during the Peloponnesian War (406 BC)

- Part of the Peloponnesian War
Date	406 BC
Location	Arginusae Islands (modern-day Dikili, İzmir, Turkey) 39°02′N 26°48′E
Result	Athenian victory

Belligerents
Sparta	Athens

Commanders and leaders
Callicratidas †	8 co-equal strategoi: Aristocrates; Aristogenes; Diomedon; Erasinides; Lysias; Pericles the Younger; Protomachus; Thrasyllus

Strength
120 ships	155 ships

Casualties and losses
70 ships	25 ships
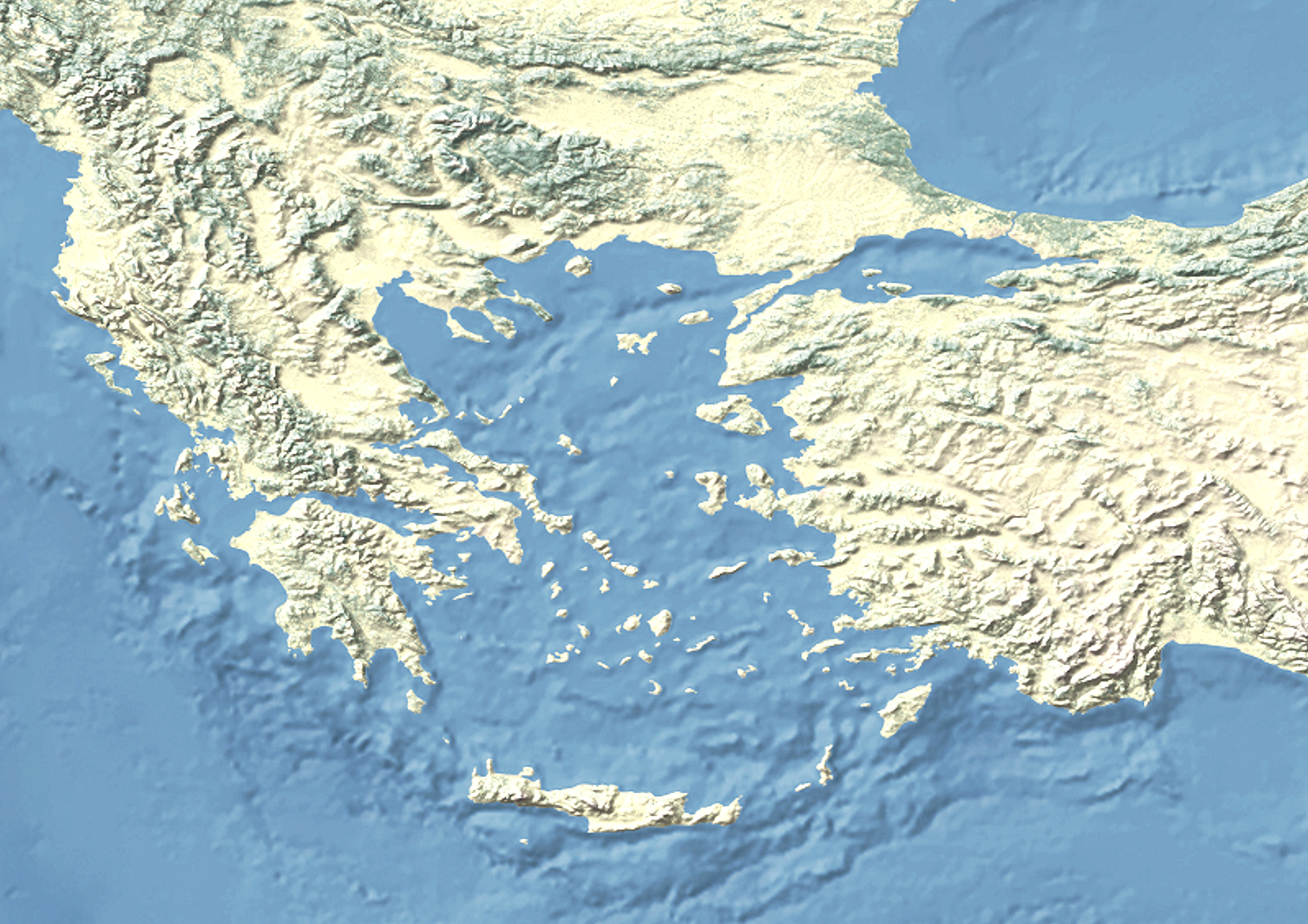
- Location of the Battle of Arginusae

The Battle of Arginusae took place in 406 BC during the Peloponnesian War near the city of Canae in the Arginusae Islands, east of the island of Lesbos. In the battle, an Athenian fleet commanded by eight strategoi defeated a Spartan fleet under Callicratidas. The battle was precipitated by a Spartan victory, which led to the Athenian fleet under Conon being blockaded at Mytilene. To relieve Conon, the Athenians assembled a scratch force composed largely of newly-constructed ships manned by inexperienced crews. The inexperienced fleet was thus tactically inferior to the Spartans, but its commanders circumvented the problem by employing new and unorthodox tactics, which allowed the Athenians to secure a dramatic and unexpected victory. Slaves and metics who participated in the battle may have been granted Athenian citizenship.

The news of the victory itself was met with jubilation at Athens. Their joy was tempered, however, by the aftermath of the battle, in which a storm prevented the ships assigned to rescue the survivors of the 25 disabled or sunken Athenian triremes from performing their duties, and a great number of sailors drowned. A fury erupted at Athens when the public learned of that, and a bitter struggle occurred after which the assembly tried and executed as a group six of the eight commanding generals.

At Sparta, meanwhile, traditionalists who had supported Callicratidas pressed for peace with Athens since they knew that a continuation of the war would lead to the reascendence of their opponent Lysander. The party initially prevailed, and a delegation was dispatched to Athens to make an offer of peace. The Athenians, however, rejected the offer, and Lysander departed to the Aegean to take command of the Spartan fleet for the remainder of the war, which would be decided less than a year later by his total victory at the Battle of Aegospotami.

== Background ==
=== Callicratidas and Conon ===
In 406 BC, Callicratidas was appointed as the navarch of the Spartan fleet, replacing Lysander. Callicratidas was a traditionalist Spartan, distrustful of Persian influence and reluctant to ask for support from the Persian prince Cyrus, who had been a strong supporter of Lysander. Thus, Callicratidas was forced to assemble his fleet and funding by seeking contributions from Sparta's allies among the Greek cities of the region. In this fashion, he assembled a fleet of some 140 triremes. Conon, meanwhile, in command of the Athenian fleet at Samos, was compelled by problems with the morale of his sailors to man only 70 of the more than 100 triremes he had in his possession.

Callicratidas, once he had assembled his fleet, sailed against Methymna, on Lesbos, which he laid siege to and stormed. From Methymna, Callicratidas could potentially move to capture the rest of Lesbos, which would clear the way for him to move his fleet to the Hellespont, where he would be athwart the all-important Athenian grain supply line. To defend Lesbos, Conon was forced to move his numerically-inferior fleet from Samos to the Hekatonnesi Islands near Methymna. When Callicratidas attacked him, however, with a fleet that had swollen to a size of 170 ships, Conon was forced to flee to Mytilene, where at the Battle of Mytilene, he was blockaded with his fleet after losing 30 ships in a clash at the mouth of the harbor. Besieged by land and sea, Conon was powerless to act against the vastly superior forces that surrounded him and only barely slipped a messenger ship out to Athens to carry the news of his plight.

=== Relief force ===
When the messenger ship reached Athens with news of Conon's situation, the assembly wasted no time in approving extreme measures to build and man a relief force. The golden statues of Nike were melted down to fund the construction of the ships, and slaves and metics were enlisted to crew the fleet. To ensure a sufficiently large and loyal group of crewmen, the Athenians possibly took the radical step of extending citizenship to thousands of slaves who rowed with the fleet. Over a hundred ships were prepared and manned through these measures, and contributions from allied ships raised the fleet's size to 150 triremes after it reached Samos. In a highly unorthodox arrangement, the fleet was commanded collaboratively by eight generals: Aristocrates, Aristogenes, Diomedon, Erasinides, Lysias, Pericles, Protomachus and Thrasyllus.

After leaving Samos, the Athenian fleet sailed to the Arginusae islands, opposite Cape Malea on Lesbos, where they camped for an evening. Callicratidas, who had sailed south to Malea with most of his fleet upon learning of the Athenians' movements, spotted their signal fires and planned to attack them by night but was prevented from doing so by a thunderstorm and so he was forced to delay his attack until morning.

== Battle ==
At dawn the next day, Callicratidas led his fleet out to meet the Athenians. He had 140 ships to match the Athenians' 150 and had left 50 to watch Conon at Mytilene. For the first time in the war, the Spartan crews and commanders were more experienced than their Athenian opposites, as the Athenians' best crews had been at sea with Conon. To counter the Spartans' superior skill and maneuverability, the Athenian commanders implemented several new and innovative tactics. Firstly, the Athenian fleet was divided into eight autonomous divisions, each commanded by one of the generals. Secondly, they arranged their fleet in a double line, instead of the traditional single line, to prevent the Spartans from using the maneuver known as the diekplous in which a trireme raced into a gap between two enemy ships and then wheeled to strike one of them in the side. If the Spartans attempted that against a double line, a ship from the second line could move up to attack the Spartan ship.

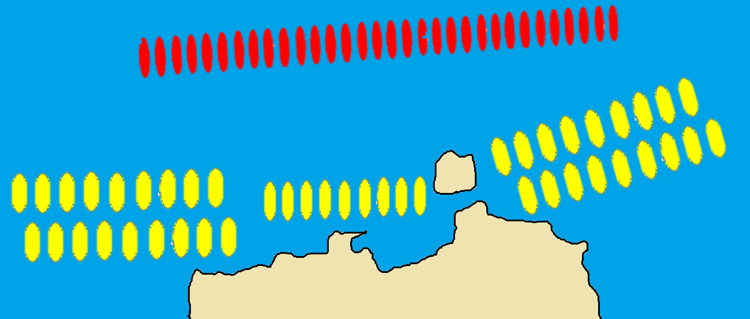
The Athenians (yellow) used an unusual tactic with which they prevented a diekplous

As the Athenians advanced, they extended their left flank out to sea, outflanking the Spartans. The superior Athenian numbers, combined with the tactics they had implemented, created a dangerous situation for the Spartans, and Callicratidas's helmsman advised him to retire without a fight, but the navarch insisted on pushing on. Dividing his force into two to meet the threat of encirclement, Callicratidas led his fleet into battle. Heated fighting ensued for some time, but eventually, Callicratidas, leading the Spartan right, was killed when his ship rammed an opposing ship, and resistance on the right collapsed. The left continued to resist for longer but was unable to stand up to the entire Athenian fleet and soon joined the right wing in flight. All told, the Spartans lost some 70 ships and the Athenians 25.

== Aftermath ==
In the immediate aftermath of the battle, the Athenian commanders had to decide on which of several pressing tasks to focus their attention. Conon was still blockaded at Mytilene by 50 Spartan ships, and decisive action against those ships could lead to their destruction before they had a chance to join the remainder of Callicratidas' fleet. At the same time, however, the survivors from the 25 Athenian ships that had been sunk or disabled in the battle remained afloat off the Arginusae islands. To address both of these concerns, the generals decided that all eight of them would sail with the majority of the fleet to Mytilene, where they would attempt to relieve Conon, and the trierarchs Thrasybulus and Theramenes would remain behind with a smaller detachment to rescue the survivors. Both missions, however, were thwarted by the sudden arrival of a storm, which drove the ships back into port. The Spartan fleet at Mytilene escaped, and rescuing the drowning sailors proved impossible.

=== Trial of generals ===
At Athens, the public relief at this unexpected victory was quickly subsumed in a bitter rhetorical battle over who was responsible for the failure to rescue the sailors. When the generals learned that the public was angry over the failed rescue, they assumed that Thrasybulus and Theramenes, who had already returned to the city, were responsible, and accordingly, they wrote letters to the assembly denouncing the two trierarchs and blaming them for the disaster. The trierarchs responded successfully to the allegations brought against them, and public anger now turned against the generals instead. The eight generals were deposed from their office and ordered to return to Athens to stand trial; two of them, Aristogenes and Protomachus, fled, but the other six returned. Upon their return, they were imprisoned, and one of them, Erasinides, was brought to trial and convicted of several charges involving misconduct in office; this trial may represent an attempt by the generals' enemies to test the wind since Erasinides, who had proposed abandoning the survivors altogether during the deliberations after the battle, may have been the easiest target among the six.

The question of how the generals should be tried for their failure to rescue the survivors was then brought before the assembly. On the first day of debate, the generals won the sympathy of the crowd by placing the blame for the tragedy entirely on the storm that had thwarted the rescue attempts. Unfortunately for them, however, the first day of debate was followed by the festival of the Apaturia at which families met together. In this context, the absence of those drowned at Arginusae was painfully evident, and when the assembly next met, the initiative passed to those who wished to treat the generals harshly. A politician named Callixeinus proposed that without further debate, the assembly should vote on the guilt or innocence of the generals. Euryptolemus, a cousin of Alcibiades and several others opposed the motion on the grounds that it was unconstitutional, but they withdrew their opposition after another politician moved for the same penalty applied to the generals to be applied to them. With the opposition from the floor now silenced, the generals' accusers sought to bring their motion to a vote.

The presiding officers of the assembly were the prytaneis, randomly-selected councilmen from the tribe that was assigned to oversee the assembly in a given month. At each meeting of the assembly, one of the prytaneis was appointed epistates, or president of the assembly. By chance, the philosopher Socrates, holding public office for the only time in his life, was epistates on the day that the generals were tried. Declaring that he would "do nothing that was contrary to the law", Socrates refused to put the measure to a vote. Emboldened, Euryptolemus rose again to speak and persuaded the assembly to pass a motion ordering that the generals be tried separately. Parliamentary maneuvering, however, undid the victory, and in the end, the original motion was carried. A vote was taken, and all six generals were found guilty and executed, including Pericles the Younger. The Athenians soon came to regret their decision in the case of the generals, and charges were brought against the principal instigators of the executions. The men escaped before they could be brought to trial, but Callixeinus returned to Athens several years later. Despised by his fellow citizens, he died of starvation.

=== Peace offer ===
At Sparta, the defeat at Arginusae added to a long list of setbacks since the war in the Aegean had begun in 412 BC. The fleet, now stationed at Chios, was in poor condition, Spartans at home were discouraged and supporters of Callicratidas were displeased by the notion that his rival Lysander would rise to power again if the war were to continue (Sparta's allies in the Aegean were demanding his return). With all of those concerns in mind, the Spartan government dispatched an embassy to Athens, offering to surrender the Spartan fort at Decelea in return for peace on the basis of the status quo in the Aegean. The proposal, however, was rejected by the Athenian assembly at the urging of Cleophon. The war continued, but Athens's decision was to prove costly less than a year later when Lysander, in command of the Spartan fleet once more, decisively defeated the Athenian fleet at Aegospotami. Within two years of the dramatic Athenian victory at Arginusae, the city of Athens surrendered, and its walls were torn down.

== The battle in fiction ==
An account of the battle appears in The Last of the Wine by Mary Renault. The narrator is an Athenian who takes part in the battle, but is shipwrecked and manages to swim to safety.

== Notes ==
=== Sources :) ===
- Aristotle, Constitution of the Athenians
- Diodorus Siculus, Library
- Fine, John V.A. The Ancient Greeks: A critical history (Harvard University Press, 1983) ISBN 0-674-03314-0
- Hornblower, Simon. The Greek World 479-323 BC (Routledge, 1991) ISBN 0-415-06557-7
- Hunt, Peter. "The Slaves and Generals of Arginusae", The American Journal of Philology, Vol. 122, 2001, pp. 359–80.
- Kagan, Donald. The Peloponnesian War (Penguin Books, 2003). ISBN 0-670-03211-5
- Xenophon (1890s) [original 4th century BC]. Hellenica . Translated by Henry Graham Dakyns – via Wikisource.
