= Aristarchus of Athens =

Aristarchus (Ancient Greek: Ἀρίσταρχος) is named with Peisander, Phrynichus, and Antiphon, as a principal leader of the "Four Hundred" during the Athenian coup of 411 BC, and is specified as one of the strongest anti-democratic partisans.

On the first breaking out of the counter-revolution we find him leaving the council-room with Theramenes, and acting at Peiraeeus at the head of the young oligarchical cavalry; and on the downfall of his party, he took advantage of his office as strategos, and rode off with a party of foreign archers to the border fort of Oenoe, then besieged by the Boeotians and Corinthians. In concert with them, and under cover of his command, he deluded the garrison, by a statement of terms concluded with Sparta, into surrender, and thus gained the place for the enemy.

He afterwards, it appears, came into the hands of the Athenians, and was with Alexicles brought to trial and executed, not later than 406 BC.
