= 411 BC =

411 BC in various calendars
Gregorian calendar	411 BC; CDXI BC
Ab urbe condita	343
Ancient Egypt era	XXVII dynasty, 115
Pharaoh	Darius II of Persia, 13
Ancient Greek Olympiad (summer)	92nd Olympiad, year 2
Assyrian calendar	4340
Balinese saka calendar	N/A
Bengali calendar	−1004 – −1003
Berber calendar	540
Buddhist calendar	134
Burmese calendar	−1048
Byzantine calendar	5098–5099
Chinese calendar	己巳年 (Earth Snake); 2287 or 2080 — to — 庚午年 (Metal Horse); 2288 or 2081
Coptic calendar	−694 – −693
Discordian calendar	756
Ethiopian calendar	−418 – −417
Hebrew calendar	3350–3351
- Hindu calendars
Vikram Samvat	−354 – −353
Shaka Samvat	N/A
Kali Yuga	2690–2691
Holocene calendar	9590
Iranian calendar	1032 BP – 1031 BP
Islamic calendar	1064 BH – 1063 BH
Javanese calendar	N/A
Julian calendar	N/A
Korean calendar	1923
Minguo calendar	2322 before ROC 民前2322年
Nanakshahi calendar	−1878
Thai solar calendar	132–133
Tibetan calendar	阴土蛇年 (female Earth-Snake) −284 or −665 or −1437 — to — 阳金马年 (male Iron-Horse) −283 or −664 or −1436

Year 411 BC was a year of the pre-Julian Roman calendar. At the time, it was known as the Year of the Consulship of Mugillanus and Rutilus (or, less frequently, year 343 Ab urbe condita). The denomination 411 BC for this year has been used since the early medieval period, when the Anno Domini calendar era became the prevalent method in Europe for naming years.

== Events ==
=== By place ===
==== Greece ====
- June 9 – The democracy of Athens is overthrown by the oligarchic extremists, Antiphon, Theramenes, Peisander and Phrynichus in an effort by the oligarchists to exert more control over the conduct of the war with Sparta and its allies. A "Council of Four Hundred" is set up. The total defeat of the Athenian expedition to Sicily and the consequent revolts of many of the subject-allies has weakened Athenian finances severely; the acknowledged purpose of the revolutionary movement is to revise the constitution to better run Athens' finances. However, its rule is high-handed and the Council of Four Hundred is only able to maintain itself for four months.
- When a mutiny breaks out amongst the troops who are fortifying Piraeus (the harbour for Athens), the Council sends Theramenes to quell it. Instead, he puts himself at the head of the mutineers. After Phrynichus, the leader of the extremists, is assassinated, an ensuing meeting of the Athenian Assembly deposes the Council and restores the traditional constitution, but restricts some of the privileges of citizenship to a body called the Five Thousand. The Assembly resumes its old form in being a committee of all citizens.
- The Athenian navy under Thrasybulus recalls Alcibiades from Sardis. Alcibiades' election is confirmed by the Athenians at the request of Theramenes. A Spartan fleet in the Hellespont at Cynossema is then defeated by an Athenian fleet commanded by Thrasybulus and Alcibiades.
- Antiphon defends himself in a speech Thucydides describes as the greatest ever made by a man on trial for his life. Nevertheless, Antiphon is unable to persuade his accusers and he is executed for treason.

=== By topic ===
==== Literature ====
- Euripides' play Iphigenia in Tauris is performed.
- Aristophanes' plays Lysistrata and Women Celebrating the Thesmophoria are performed.

== Births ==
- Timoleon, Greek statesman and general (approximate date) (d. 337 BC)

== Deaths ==
- Antiphon, Athenian politician and orator (b. 480 BC)
- Phrynichus, Athenian general (assassinated)
