= Aristotle of Athens =

Ancient Greek oligarch (5th century BCE)

Aristoteles (Ancient Greek: Ἀριστοτέλης) or Aristotle was one of the thirty tyrants established at Athens in 404 BCE. From an allusion in the speech of Theramenes before his condemnation, Aristoteles appears to have been also one of the Four Hundred oligarchs in the Athenian coup of 411 BC, and to have taken an active part in the scheme of fortifying Eëtioneia and admitting the Spartans into the Piraeus in 411 BCE.

In 405 BCE he was living in banishment, and is mentioned by the writer Xenophon as being with Lysander during the siege of Athens. Plato introduces him as one of the persons in the Parmenides and as a very young man at the time of the dialogue.

There was also an "Aristotle of Athens" mentioned by Diogenes Laërtius, who was apparently an orator and statesman, under whose name were known some forensic orations that later writers considered distinguished for their elegance. This person may be identical with Aristoteles.
