= Hegesandridas =

Spartan general during the Peloponnesian War

Hegesandridas or Agesandridas (Ancient Greek: Ἡγησανδρίδας or Ἀγησανδρίδας), son of a "Hegesander" or "Agesander", who could have been a member of the last Spartan embassy sent to Athens before the Peloponnesian War. Hegesandridas was a Spartan general in the Peloponnesian War. In 411 BC he was placed in command of a fleet of 42 ships instructed to further a revolt in Euboea. News of their being seen off Las of Laconia arrived in Athens at the time when the Four Hundred were building their fort of Eëtioneia on a promontory commanding Piraeus, and the coincidence was used by Theramenes as evidence of their treasonable intentions. Further intelligence that the same fleet had sailed over from Megara to Salamis coincided again with the riot in Piraeus, and was held to be certain proof of Theramenes' allegations.

Thucydides thought it possible that the movement was really made in concert with the Athenian oligarchs, but it is far more probable that Hegesandridas was merely prompted by the hope of profiting by the existing dissensions at play in Athens. Hegesandridas' desired destination was soon seen to be Euboea; the fleet doubled around Sunium, and finally came to harbour at Oropos in September 411 BC. A great alarm went up on behalf of the threatened island of Euboea, and a fleet was hastily manned, which amounted to thirty-six galleys, and the Battle of Eretria began. But the new crews were inexperienced and poorly equipped; a stratagem of the Eretrians kept the soldiers at a distance, at the very moment when, in response to a signal from the town, the Spartan admiral moved to attack. Hegesandridas obtained an easy victory: the Athenians lost 22 ships, and all of Euboea, except Oreus, revolted. Extreme consternation seized the city. Athens, Thucydides adds, had now once again to thank their enemy's tardiness. Had the victors attacked Piraeus, either the city would have fallen victim to its distractions, or by the recall of the fleet from Asia, everything except Attica would have been placed in their hands.

Hegesandridas was content with his success. However, after the Spartan defeat at Cynossema, Hegesandridas was ordered to reinforce the Hellespontine fleet under the Spartan admiral Mindarus. Fifty of Hegesandridas' ships (partly Euboean) were dispatched, but all were lost in a storm off Athos (according to Ephorus).

On hearing of this disaster, Hegesandridas appears to have sailed with what ships he could gather to the Hellespont and was at that location at the opening of Xenophon's Hellenica. While at the Hellespont, he defeated a small squadron that had recently arrived from Athens under Thymochares, his opponent at Eretria. Hegesandridas is mentioned once again as an epibates (Spartan naval commander) on the Thracian coast in 408 BC.
