= Critias =

Athenian politician (c. 460 – 403 BC)

- Κριτίας
- Born: 460 BC; Athens
- Died: 403 BC (aged 55–56); Piraeus
- Known for: Leading member of the Thirty Tyrants

Critias (/ˈkrɪtiəs/; Ancient Greek: Κριτίας, Kritias; c. 460 – 403 BC) was an ancient Athenian poet, philosopher and political leader. He is known today for being a student of Socrates, a writer of some regard, and for becoming the leader of the Thirty Tyrants, who ruled Athens for several months after the conclusion of the Peloponnesian War in 404/403.

== Ancestry ==
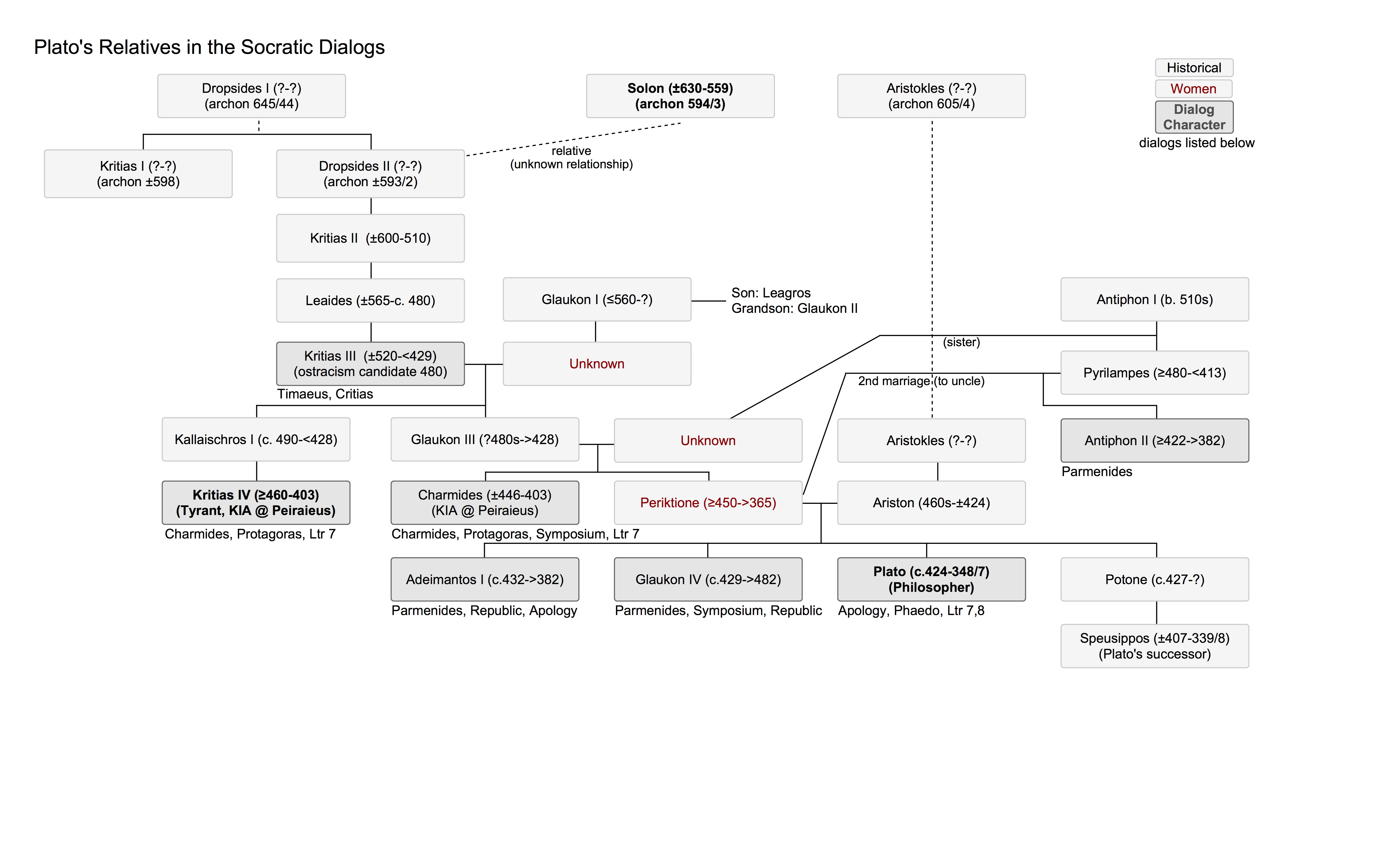
Plato's relatives in the Socratic dialogues

Critias was the scion of one of the premier families in Athens. The evidence for his lineage comes from several sources and there are numerous gaps in what they have to say. The reconstruction in Davies' Athenian Propertied Families is the most reliable and his discussion covers all the unknowns and suppositions. Without detailing the uncertainties here, as best we know, his ancestors were:

The progenitor of the family was Dropides, who lived in the 7th century BCE. He had two sons: Critias I and Dropides II. The latter was a "relative and a dear friend" of Solon, the lawgiver of Athens. Both men were in their prime at the beginning of the 6th century BCE and Dropides served as archon eponymous shortly after Solon held that position in 594/3. Solon died in the late 560s; presumably Dropides did as well.

Dropides II was the father of Critias II, who lived into the late 6th century. The son of Critias II was Leaides, who is known only from an ostracon dating to the 480s, which named "Critias [III] son of Leaides" as the miscreant deserving of exile. It was discovered in a well near a road southwest of the Athenian agora in 1936. Critias III in turn had Callaeschus, the father of Critias IV, the tyrant.

The family clearly had a long and illustrious (if at times contentious) history in Athenian politics. In addition to the Solon connection, they were related to Plato's family, equally well established among the Athenian elite, and also to the family of the orator Andocides.

== Early life ==
Little is known of Critias' early years. Athenaeus reported that he was a trained aulos player. He was best attested as a poet, with a variety of forms to his credit: hexameters, elegies, and dramas. Among the plays tentatively assigned to him are Tennis, Rhadamanthys, Pirithus, and the satyr play Sisyphus. All of these, however, have been contested by both ancient and modern scholars, with Euripides proposed as the most likely alternate author. (The "Sisyphus fragment" presumably comes from the satyr play – again, attributed to either Critias or Euripides.)

Critias also wrote prose. Among his most important works were a series of "Commonwealths" or treatises on the governments of various city-states. Athens, Lacedaemonia (Sparta), and Thessaly are specific mentions made in ancient sources. Other works include Aphorisms, Lectures, On the Nature of Desires or of Virtues, and Proems(Prologues) for Public Speaking.

He believed religion could play an important role in achieving obedience to the state. According to pseudo-Plutarch, he was among those who criticized the logographer Antiphon, though there is little evidence that he (or Antiphon) participated in Athenian politics during the years that the latter was active (430s and 420s). What little there is was provided by Cicero, who names him as an orator, along with Lysias and Theramenes.

Hard upon them (the orators Pericles, Alcibiades, and Thucydides [not the historian]) came Critias, Theramenes, and Lysias. Much was written down by Lysias, some things by Critias; we hear of Theramenes.

In terms of style, he was described as "lofty of sentiment, also pride", "stately, much like Antiphon, and sublime, verging on majesty, and says much in the negative, yet is rather pure in style".

In general he appears to have stayed in the background, or perhaps on the periphery of Athenian politics – dabbling rather than plunging headlong. All this began to change in 415.

=== Student of Socrates ===
The philosopher Socrates was well known for attracting the young men of Athens' elite. He questioned democracy and conventional morality, and challenged the certainty with which many intellectuals propounded their thoughts, which endeared him to the rebellious adolescent minds of the younger generation. Critias was among those who gravitated to him, and the two formed a friendship that was to last many years, though eventually they drifted apart. Plato, who cast Socrates as the protagonist of most of his dialogues, included Critias as an interlocutor in two of them. Though these were written many years after both Socrates and Critias were dead, Plato made no mention in them of the activities that tarnished Critias’ reputation in his later years.

=== Mutilation of the Hermes ===
In the spring of 415, the Athenians decided to send an armada to Sicily to counter a perceived threat from the city of Syracuse. Just before it was to sail, one of the social clubs in Athens staged a city-wide raid where they mutilated statues of the god Hermes that stood outside homes and in various locations around Athens. The citizens were outraged and saw this event as a bad omen. Even though the fleet sailed on schedule, the search for the perpetrators went on relentlessly afterwards. Among those arrested was Critias. While many of the accused were summarily executed or left town to escape prosecution, Critias was eventually exonerated when the testimony of his accuser was discredited by Andocides and then withdrawn. As a member of Athens' elite and in view of his later actions, it is not clear whether he was involved or not, but he was freed nonetheless.

== The Four Hundred ==
The failure of the Sicilian expedition in 413, in which tens of thousands of Athenian soldiers were killed or captured, rocked the city's political and social stability. In 411, as Athenian prosecution of the Peloponnesian War limped along, a faction of oligarchic sympathizers contrived to take over the government and end the war. They succeeded in convincing the Athenian Assembly that governmental change was necessary and instituted in place of it the council of the Four Hundred. The coup was put down a few months later and democracy gradually restored.

Critias has been suspected by some modern scholars as being a member of the Four Hundred, but there is little evidence of this. Arguing against that possibility is that in the days following their deposition he was recorded as proposing two decrees before the reconstituted Assembly: one to hold a post-mortem trial of one of the perpetrators of the coup, one Phrynichus, the other to repatriate his friend Alcibiades, who had been exiled at the start of the Sicilian expedition for mocking the Eleusinian Mysteries, the most sacred religious cult at Athens. The playboy-general was at that time assisting the Athenian fleet at Samos and attempting to ingratiate himself with those who had banished him a few years earlier. These two actions, while not clearly exonerating Critias, show that he was politically adept enough to shed the stigma of participating in the takeover, if he indeed had.

Alcibiades' rapprochement with his fellow citizens was not to last. In 407, while commanding a fleet in the eastern Aegean, he temporarily handed over some of his ships to a subordinate, who proceeded to instigate and then lose an encounter with the Spartan fleet in the area. Alcibiades was held responsible and banished once again. As his advocate, Critias was subsequently banished as well, and he spent the next few years in Thessaly.

While there, he was reported by Xenophon to be "setting up a democracy in Thessaly and was arming the Penestae against their masters". Also, he "consorted with men subject to lawlessness rather than to a sense of justice". Countering this, Philostratus said, "he rendered their oligarchies the more grievous by conversing with those in power there and by attacking all democracy. He slandered the Athenians, claiming that they, of all mankind, erred the most".

== Tyranny of the Thirty ==
After the battle of Aigospotami in 405, in which the Athenian fleet was destroyed, the city was besieged by the Spartans and eventually capitulated. The Spartans demanded that the city take down its walls, recall its exiles (oligarchic sympathizers all), and restore the ancient government – i.e., dismantle its democracy. At their "suggestion", a ruling body of thirty governors was selected, mimicking Sparta's own ruling board of thirty, the gerousia. Critias had returned from Thessaly as part of the recall of the exiles and now became one of the leaders of the "Thirty". One source said that they also appointed five men to supervise this group, called ephors after the similar body at Sparta. Critias was one of the five. A third body was designated: the Three Thousand – those of the cavalry (hippeis) and infantry (hoplite) classes, who were allowed to keep their armor and weapons after the rest of the citizens had been forcibly disarmed. This body would constitute the "citizenry" of the new Athens. Socrates and Xenophon (our source for much of this history) were among this group.

During the next few months, as the Thirty consolidated their hold on the institutions of government, they arrested, confiscated the property of, and summarily executed a wider and wider swath of Athenian citizens and resident aliens (metics). At every step, Critias was the leading advocate for more extreme levels of violence, to the point where he was getting resistance even from within the Thirty. The leading "moderate" was Theramenes, and his continued cautioning against the continuing destruction ultimately got him arrested and executed at Critias' direction.

Critias' relationship with Socrates withered during these months. At one point, the Thirty compelled the Three Thousand to begin arresting metics so they could be stripped of their property and executed – this so the citizens would become complicit in the slaughter. With blood on their hands, they would be less likely to attempt an overthrow of the oligarchy. When Socrates was ordered to go with three others to arrest one Leon of Salamis, he ignored the order and simply "went home". He was later recorded as offering this not-so-oblique criticism of Critias:

It seems enough to me that a herdsman who lets his cattle decrease and go to the bad should not admit that he is a poor cowherd; but stranger still that a statesman, when he causes the citizens to decrease and go to the bad, should feel no shame nor think himself a poor statesman.

At another point, his critique became more personal. Xenophon related that Socrates took his old friend to task for being overly enamored with a young man.

Critias seems to have the feelings of a pig: he can no more keep away from Euthydemus than pigs can help rubbing themselves against stones.

Socrates' reputation and general popularity protected him from the punishment meted out to Theramenes. Nonetheless:

Now Critias bore a grudge against Socrates for this; and when he was … drafting laws with Charicles, he bore it in mind. He inserted a clause which made it illegal "to teach the art of words." It was a calculated insult to Socrates, whom he saw no means of attacking except by imputing to him the practice constantly attributed to philosophers, and so making him unpopular.

When Critias and Charicles confronted Socrates with the new law, the latter did what he had done so many times before and began to probe its actual meaning. Who could he talk to, or not talk to, and about what? After several minutes of this, Socrates summarized:

"Then must I keep off the subjects of which these supply illustrations: Justice, Holiness, and so forth?" "Indeed yes," said Charicles, "and cowherds too: else you may find the cattle decrease."

Many Athenians had left the city when the attacks of the Thirty began. In the spring of 403, they returned under the leadership of Thrasyboulus and eventually commandeered the fortress called Munichia in Peiraieus, Athens' port city. When the Thirty brought their forces to Piraeus to root them out, the two armies fought in the streets. During this confrontation Critias was killed, which left the oligarchs without their strongest leader. This spelled doom for their reign, and they were soon deposed and democracy reestablished.

== Legacy ==
Critias was in ancient times castigated for his activities under the Thirty. Philostratus, in his Lives of the Sophists, had much to say about him. His most damning comments were:

In cruelty and in bloodthirstiness he outdid the Thirty. He also collaborated with the Spartans in absurd resolution in order that Attica, emptied of its flock of men, might become a grazing-ground for sheep. Hence it seems to me that he is the worst of all the men who have gained a reputation for wickedness… It appears to some that he became a good man toward the end of his life, inasmuch as he employed tyranny as his winding-sheet [burial shroud]. But let it be declared on my part that none among men died well in behalf of a poor choice. And it seems to me that for this reason the man's wisdom and his thoughts were taken less seriously by the Greeks. Unless speech corresponds to character, we shall appear to be discoursing in an alien language, as though we were playing flutes.

Xenophon lumped Critias in with his friend Alcibiades in his criticism:

Critias and Alcibiades became disciples of Socrates and did the city much harm. For, in the oligarchy, Critias turned into the most thievish and violent and murderous of all, while Alcibiades, in the democracy, was of all men the most uncontrolled and wanton and violent. If the two of them did the city harm, I shall not offer a defense.

Plato, on the other hand, said nothing disparaging about Critias directly – either about his exile in Thessaly or his time in the Thirty. Yet, the philosopher was loath to join the oligarchy because of its violent means. In his seventh letter, he said:

In the days of my youth my experience was the same as that of many others. I thought that as soon as I should become my own master I would immediately enter into public life. But it so happened, I found, that the following changes occurred in the political situation. In the government then existing, reviled as it was by many, a revolution took place; and the revolution was headed by fifty-one leaders, of whom eleven were in the City and ten in the Piraeus (each of these sections dealing with the market and with all municipal matters requiring management) and Thirty were established as irresponsible rulers of all. Now of these some were actually connections and acquaintances of mine; and indeed they invited me at once to join their administration, thinking it would be congenial. The feelings I then experienced, owing to my youth, were in no way surprising: for I imagined that they would administer the State by leading it out of an unjust way of life into a just way, and consequently I gave my mind to them very diligently, to see what they would do. And indeed I saw how these men within a short time caused men to look back on the former government as a golden age; and above all how they treated my aged friend Socrates, whom I would hardly scruple to call the most just of men then living, when they tried to send him, along with others, after one of the citizens, to fetch him by force that he might be put to death—their object being that Socrates, whether he wished or no, might be made to share in their political actions; he, however, refused to obey and risked the uttermost penalties rather than be a partaker in their unholy deeds. So when I beheld all these actions and others of a similar grave kind, I was indignant, and I withdrew myself from the evil practices then going on.

For all the condemnation he received from his contemporaries, Critias was soon forgotten by most people. By the late 4th century, Aristotle could write:

The many do not demand a statement of the case if you wish to extol Achilles, for all know his deeds; yet it is necessary to make use of them. Also, if you wish to extol Critias, it is necessary. For not many know his deeds.

As for Critias' efforts as a poet and essayist, his works survived for several centuries, as the above citations attest, but his repute as a writer eventually faded. Philostratus, writing in the 3rd century CE, said of Critias:

He wrote tragedies, elegies, and prose works, of which not enough has survived for any sure estimate to be made of his talent. He was greatly admired by the later sophists, especially by Herodes Atticus.

One of the tragedies, now lost save for a few fragments, may have been "Pirithous": although some scholars attribute it to Euripides, another camp ascribes it to Critias.

Herodes Atticus, a 2nd-century CE Roman senator and rhetorician, attempted a revival of Critias’ works in the 2nd century CE. Among his extensive comments on Herodes, Philostratus inserted this:

For while he devoted himself to the study of all the older writers, from Critias he was inseparable, and he made the Greeks better acquainted with him, since he had hitherto been neglected and overlooked.

Our judgment today would not be much different than that of Philostratus, since Critias' extant works have diminished still further. What fragments survive were collected by the German historian Herman Diels and first published in his Die Fragmente der Vorsokratiker in 1903 – in Greek. This seminal work was later revised several times, most recently by Walter Kranz in 1959. For discussions of Critias and translations of his fragments into English, see the works by Kathleen Freeman and Rosamund Kent Sprague listed in the references.

== In popular culture ==
- A generally unflattering portrait of Critias is provided in Mary Renault's historical novel The Last of the Wine, a retelling of Athens' last years in the Peloponnesian War and its immediate aftermath.
- Likewise in Alessandro Barbero's historical novel Le Ateniesi, another tale set in the latter years of the Peloponnesian War.

== See also ==
- List of speakers in Plato's dialogues

== General references ==
- Davies, J. K. (1971). Athenian Propertied Families 600–300 BC. London: Oxford University Press.
- Diels, Hermann and Walter Kranz. Die Fragmente der Vorsokratiker, Griechisch und Deutsch von Hermann Diels, Neunte Auflage Herausgegeben. Weidmannsche Buchhandlung, 1959.
- Freeman, Kathleen. Ancilla to the Pre-Socratic Philosophers: A complete translation of the Fragments in Diels, Fragmente der Vorsokratiker. Cambridge, Mass.: Harvard Univ. Press, 1948.
- Freeman, Kathleen. The Pre-Socratic Philosophers: A Companion to Diels, Fragmente der Vorsokratiker. Oxford: Basil Blackwell, 1946.
- Nails, D. (2002). The People of Plato: A Prosopography of Plato and Other Socratics. Cambridge: Hackett Publishing.
- Rosenmeyer, Thomas G. (1949). "The Family of Critias". American Journal of Philology. 70 (4). The Johns Hopkins University Press: 404–410. doi:10.2307/291107. JSTOR 291107.
- Sprague, Rosamond Kent, ed. The Older Sophists: A Complete Translation by Several Hands of the Fragments in Die Fragmente der Vorsokratiker. Indianapolis: Hackett Publishing Co., 2001.
- Vanderpool, Eugene. "Some Ostraka from the Athenian Agora." Hesperia Supplements 8 (1949): 394–496. www.jstor.org/stable/1353914.
