= Scironides =

Ancient Ahtenian admiral

Scironides (Ancient Greek: Σκιρωνίδης; born mid-5th century BC – died after 411 BC) was an Athenian naval commander.

== Bibliography ==
In 412 BC, Scironides was appointed commander of the Athenian and Argive fleet alongside Phrynichus and Onomacles, and was immediately dispatched to Asia Minor. After a victorious engagement against the inhabitants of Miletus—who had received assistance from the Persian satrap Tissaphernes and the Spartan Chalcideus—the three generals began to lay siege to the city. However, when the Peloponnesian and Sicilian fleets arrived to aid the Milesians, they withdrew to Samos on Phrynichus' recommendation.

That year, Scironides remained stationed at Samos. The other generals who stayed there included Carmineus and possibly Thrasycles, while Strombichides, Onomacles, and Euctemon sailed against Chios with thirty ships and part of the one thousand hoplites who had fought at Miletus.

In 411 BC, Peisander brought charges against Phrynichus before the Athenian assembly, which resulted in his dismissal from office along with Scironides. In their place, Diomedon and Leon were appointed as the new commanding admirals of the fleet at Samos.

== Bibliography ==
- Smith, William. A Dictionary of Greek and Roman Biography and Mythology. London: John Murray; printed by Spottiswoode and Co., New-Street Square and Parliament Street, 1848. Available online at the Perseus Digital Library.
- Thucydides. History of the Peloponnesian War, Book VIII. Translated by Thomas Hobbes. London: Bohn, 1843. Available online at the Perseus Digital Library.
