= Thymochares =

Late 5th-century BC Athenian general

Thymochares (Gr. Θυμοχάρης) was an Athenian general under the Four Hundred who may have come from the deme of Sphettos.

In late 411 BC, commanding 36 triremes, he opposed the arrival of the Spartan commander Hegesandridas at Oropos, but was routed, losing 22 ships at the Battle of Eretria. Most of the rowers fled to Eretria where they were slaughtered. Thucydides does not say what happened to Thymochares after the defeat. He next appears in Xenophon at an unknown location (probably somewhere in Euboea), where he arrives with ‘a few ships’, but is again defeated by Hegesandridas.
