= Phrynichus =

Phrynichus (Greek: Φρύνιχος) may refer to:

== People ==
- Phrynichus (tragic poet) or Phrynichus Tragicus (6th-5th century BC), abbreviated in lexica as [Phryn.Trag.], pioneer of Greek tragedy, most famous for The Fall of Miletus
- Phrynichus (comic poet) or Phrynichus Comicus (late 5th century BC), abbreviated in lexica as [Phryn.Com.], writer of old Attic comedy
- Phrynichus (oligarch) (died 411 BC), Athenian general during the Peloponnesian War who took a leading part in establishing the oligarchy of the Four Hundred
- Phrynichus Arabius or Phrynichus Atticista (2nd century AD), abbreviated in lexica as [Phryn.], grammarian and rhetorician

== Animals ==
- Phrynichus (arachnid), a genus in the order Amblypygi
