= Thucydides, son of Melesias =

Ancient Athenian conservative politician

Thucydides, son of Melesias (/θjuːˈsɪdɪdiːz/; Greek: Θουκυδίδης) was a prominent politician of ancient Athens and the leader for a number of years of the powerful conservative faction. While it is likely he is related to the later historian and general Thucydides, son of Olorus, the details are uncertain; maternal grandfather and grandson fits the available evidence.

== Life and political career ==
Thucydides was born in the deme of Alopeke (Ἀλωπεκή) of Athens. The exact year of his birth is unknown, but his family was noble and he was a relative of Cimon, the charismatic general and leader of the conservative party. After Cimon's death, he succeeded him in the leadership of the conservatives and decided to exert a vehement opposition against Pericles, who was leading Athens at the time.

Thucydides represented the thorough-going conservative party at Athens; their views are most clearly represented by "the Old Oligarch" in his Constitution of the Athenians, which has come down to us among the works of Xenophon. Donald Kagan suggests that Thucydides' ultimate goal, which he could not state openly as doing so would alienate the pro-democratic majority, was to roll back the constitutional changes made by Ephialtes, reinstating the more aristocratic and conservative government that had prevailed in Cimon's day.

Thucydides' political strength reached its peak in the wake of the First Peloponnesian War and the reorganization of the Athenian empire in the early 440s BC. Thucydides developed a new and effective political tactic by having his supporters sit together in the assembly, increasing their apparent strength and giving them a united voice. Kagan asserts that this tactic helped Thucydides mount a concerted opposition to Pericles which brought to light ideological differences among Pericles' supporters.

In 444 BC, the conservative and the democratic parties confronted each other in a fierce battle. Though some modern scholars doubt the details of Plutarch's account, according to Plutarch, Thucydides, the new leader of the conservatives, accused Pericles, the leader of the democrats, of profligacy, criticizing the way Pericles spent the money for his ambitious building plan. Thucydides managed to incite the passions of the Athenian Assembly in his favor, but when Pericles took the floor, the atmosphere immediately changed. Pericles proposed to pay for all the construction from his own purse, under the term that all these monuments would belong to him and not to Athens. The public applauded his stance and Thucydides suffered an unexpected defeat from the charismatic orator. As a result of his failure in confronting Pericles, Thucydides was ostracized for ten years, in 442 BC, and Pericles once again stood unchallenged in the Athenian political arena. Plutarch relates that, when Thucydides was asked by Sparta's king, Archidamus II, if he or Pericles was a better fighter, Thucydides answered without any hesitation that Pericles was a better fighter, because, even when he is defeated, he manages to convince the audience that he won.

After being ostracized, Thucydides is said to have traveled to Sybaris, a city of Magna Graecia on the Gulf of Taranto in Italy, or Aegina, but this is unconfirmed.

Thucydides is mentioned in The Wasps by Aristophanes, as an example of a defendant who is silenced by the overwhelming power of his accuser's (Pericles') arguments.

While in Athens, Thucydides is also said to have accused Pericles' personal friend, Anaxagoras, of atheism and sympathy for the Persians.
