= Parmenides (dialogue) =

Dialogue by Plato

Parmenides (Greek: Παρμενίδης) is one of the dialogues of Plato. It is widely considered to be the most challenging and enigmatic of Plato's dialogues. The Parmenides purports to be an account of a meeting between the two great philosophers of the Eleatic school, Parmenides and Zeno of Elea, and a young Socrates. The occasion of the meeting was the reading by Zeno of his treatise defending Parmenidean monism against those partisans of plurality who asserted that Parmenides' supposition that there is a one gives rise to intolerable absurdities and contradictions. The dialogue is set during a supposed meeting between Parmenides and Zeno of Elea in Socrates' home city of Athens. The dialogue is chronologically the earliest of all, as Socrates is only nineteen years old, so he takes the unusual position of the student, while Parmenides serves as the lecturer.

Most scholars agree that the dialogue does not record historic conversations and is most likely an invention by Plato.

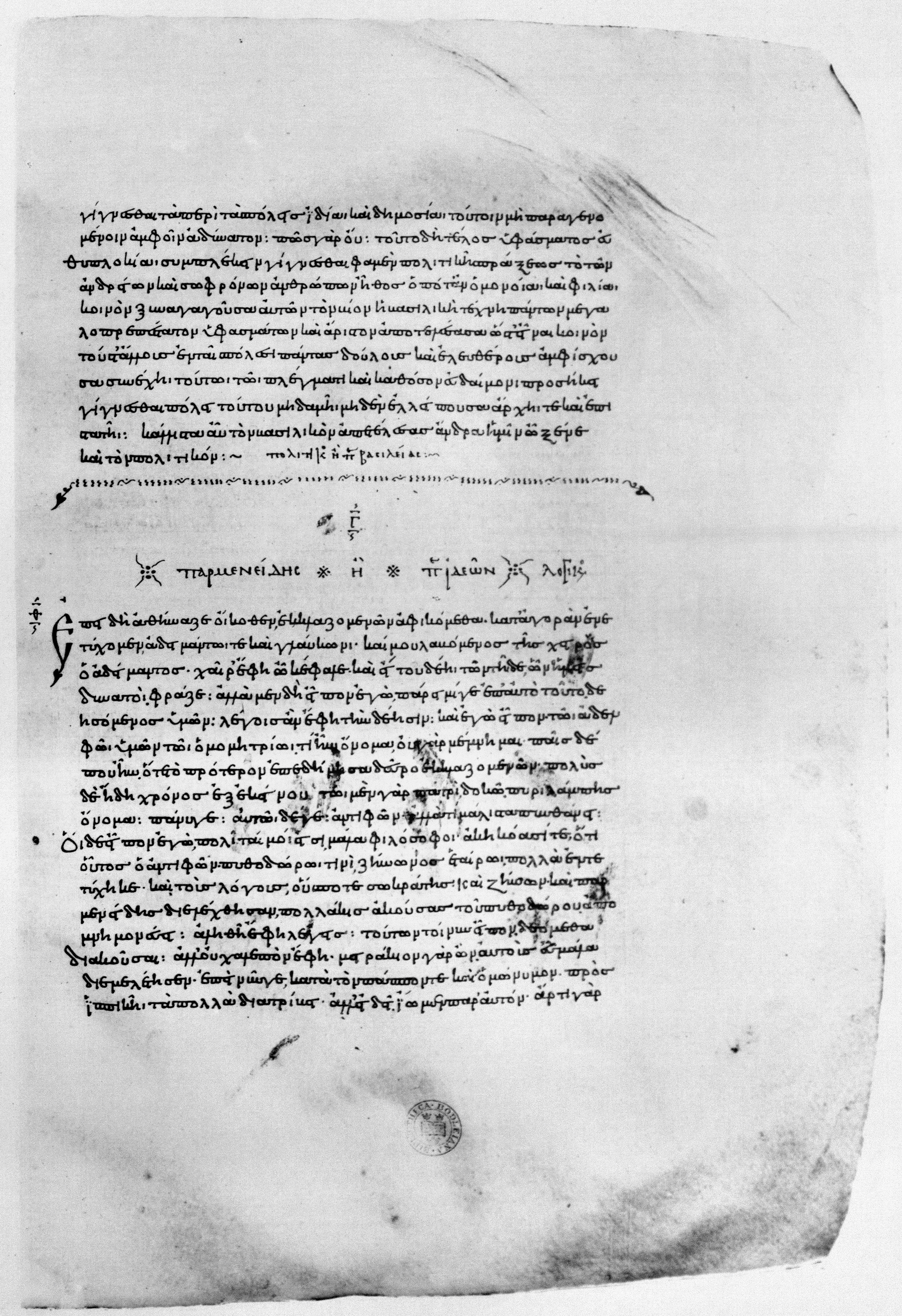
Parmenides

== Discussion with Socrates ==
The heart of the dialogue opens with a challenge by Socrates to the elder and revered Parmenides and Zeno. Employing his customary method of attack, the reductio ad absurdum, Zeno has argued that if—as the pluralists say—things are many, then they will be both like and unlike; but this is an impossible situation, for unlike things cannot be like, nor like things unlike. But this difficulty vanishes, says Socrates, if we are prepared to make a distinction between sensibles, on one hand, and Forms (in which sensibles participate) on the other—then it is the Form of Likeness that cannot be, and is not, unlike, while one and the same sensible thing can indeed be simultaneously like and unlike (or one and many), by participating in the Forms of both Likeness and Unlikeness (or both Unity and Plurality):

"But if someone should show that I am both one and many, what is so astonishing about that? When he intends to show that I am many, he says that my right side is different from my left, and my front different from my back, and likewise with my upper and lower parts—for, I believe, I do partake of multitude. But when he intends to show that I am one [thing], he will say I am one man among the seven of us; since I also partake of oneness, he therefore proves both to be true. So if someone attempts to show that the same things—such as stones and sticks and the like—are [both] many and one, then we will say that he demonstrates these to be many and one, and not that 'the one' is many, nor 'the many' one."

— Plato, Parmenides, 129c–d

Hence, concludes Socrates, there is no problem in demonstrating that sensible things may have opposite attributes; what would cause consternation—and earn his admiration—would be if someone were to show that the Forms themselves were capable of admitting contrary predicates.

At this point, Parmenides takes over as Socrates' interlocutor and dominates the remainder of the dialogue. After establishing that Socrates himself has made the distinction between Forms and sensibles, Parmenides asks him what sorts of Form he is prepared to recognize. Socrates replies that he has no doubt about the existence of mathematical, ethical and aesthetic Forms (e.g., Unity, Plurality, Goodness, Beauty), but is unsure of Forms of Man, Fire and Water; he is almost certain, though admits to some reservations, that undignified objects like hair, mud and dirt do not have Forms. Parmenides suggests that when he is older and more committed to philosophy, he will consider all the consequences of his theory, even regarding seemingly insignificant objects like hair and mud.

For the remainder of the first part of the dialogue, Parmenides draws Socrates out on certain aspects of the Theory of Forms, and in the process brings to bear five arguments against the theory; these can be summarized as follows:

Argument 1. (130e–131e) If particular things come to partake of the Form of Beauty or Likeness or Largeness, they thereby become beautiful or alike or large. Parmenides presses Socrates on how, precisely, many particulars can participate in a single Form. On one hand, if the Form as a whole is present in each of its many instances, then it would—as a whole—be in numerically different places, and thus separate from itself. Socrates suggests that the Form might be like a day, and thus present in many places at once. Parmenides counters that this would be little different from a single sail covering a number of people, wherein different parts touch different individuals; consequently, the Form is many.

Argument 2. (132a–b) Socrates' reason for believing in the existence of a single Form in each case is that when he views a number of (say) large things, there appears to be a single character that they all share—viz., the character of Largeness. But if Largeness is also, in some sense, considered to be large, then there is a further series of large things: the original set, plus Largeness itself; and if all members of this series partake of a single Form, then there must be another Largeness, of which large things and the first Form of Largeness partake. But if this second Form of Largeness is also large, then there should be a third Form of Largeness over the large things and the first two Forms, and so on ad infinitum. Hence, instead of there being one Form in every case, we are confronted with an indefinite number. This Largeness regress is more famously known under the name given to it by Aristotle: that is, as the Third Man Argument.

Argument 3. (132b–c) To the suggestion that each Form is a thought existing in a soul, thus maintaining the unity of the Form, Parmenides replies that a thought must be a thought of something that is a Form; thus, we still have to explain the participation relation. Further, if things share in Forms that are no more than thoughts, then either things consist of thoughts and think, or else they are thoughts, yet do not think.

Argument 4. (132c–133a) Socrates now suggests that the Forms are patterns in nature (Ancient Greek: παραδείγματα, romanized: paradeigmata; "paradigms"), of which the many instances are copies or likenesses. Parmenides argues that if the many instances are like the Forms, then the Forms are like their instances. Yet if things are like, then they come to be like by participating in Likeness; therefore Likeness is like the likeness in concrete things, and another regress is generated.

Argument 5. (133a–134e) Parmenides calls this argument the "greatest" of the "difficulties" to which the theory of Forms is subject, and so it has often been dubbed the "greatest difficulty" (Gk. μεγίστη ἀπορία, megístē aporía—though Plato himself never uses exactly this phrase) argument. Interpretation of this argument is particularly divisive; what follows is one possible reconstruction: Forms are separate from the sensible world; if a given Form is essentially relative—i.e., cannot be defined without reference to another entity, as "master" cannot be defined without something of which to be master—it must be other Forms to which it is relative. Similarly for the sensible things of our world: if such a thing is what it is relative to something else, the "something else" must also be of the sensible realm. The Form of Mastership has its being relative to the Form of Slavery; a master in our world, however, can only be master of a particular slave or set of slaves—no terrestrial master is master of Slave itself, and no terrestrial slave is subject to Mastership itself. So it is with knowledge, which too is essentially relational (being always knowledge of something): all our knowledge is such with respect to our world, not to the world of the Forms; ideal Knowledge, conversely, is knowledge not of the things of our world, but of the world of the Forms. Hence, we cannot know the Forms. What is more, the gods who dwell in the divine world can have no knowledge of us, and neither can their ideal mastership rule us.

In spite of Socrates' inability to defend the theory against Parmenides' arguments, in the succeeding transitional section of the dialogue Parmenides himself appears to advocate the theory. He insists that without Forms there can be no possibility of dialectic, and that Socrates was unable to uphold the theory because he has been insufficiently exercised. There follows a description of the kind of exercise, or training, that Parmenides recommends.

The remainder of the dialogue is taken up with an actual performance of such an exercise, where a young Aristoteles (later a member of the Thirty Tyrants; not to be confused with Plato's eventual student Aristotle) takes the place of Socrates as Parmenides' interlocutor.

== Discussion with Aristoteles ==
This difficult second part of the dialogue is generally agreed to be one of the most challenging, and sometimes bizarre, pieces in the whole of the Platonic corpus. One of the second part is "whether Plato was committed to any of the arguments developed in the second part of the dialogue." It consists of an unrelenting series of difficult and subtle arguments, where the exchange is stripped of all but the bare essentials of the arguments involved. Gone are the drama and colour we are accustomed to from earlier dialogues.

The second part of the dialogue can be divided thus:

Hypothesis/Deduction n. 1 (137c-142a): If it is one. The one cannot be made up of parts, because then the one would be made of many. Nor can it be a whole, because wholes are made of parts. Thus the one has no parts and is not a whole. It has not a beginning, a middle nor an end because these are parts, it is therefore unlimited. It has no shape because it is neither linear nor circular: a circle has parts all equidistant from the centre, but the one has no parts nor a centre; It is not a line because a line has a middle and two extremes, which the one cannot have. Thus the one has no shape. The one cannot be in anything nor in itself. If it was in another it would be all surrounded and by what it is inside and would be touched at many parts by what contains it, but the one has no parts and thus cannot be inside something else. If it were in itself it would contain itself, but if it is contained then it is different from what contains it and thus the one would be two. The one cannot move because movement is change or change in position. It cannot change because it has no parts to change. If it moves position it moves either circularly or linearly. If it spins in place its outer part revolves around its middle but the one has neither. If it moves its position it moves through something else, which it cannot be inside. Thus the one does not move. The one must be itself and cannot be different from it. The one does not take part in the flowing of time so it is imperishable.

Hypothesis/Deduction n. 2 (142b–155e): If the one is. The one is, it must be and it is part of being. The one is part of being and vice versa. Being is a part of the one, the one is a whole that is a group of sections. The one does not participate in the being, so it must be a single part. Being is unlimited and is contained in everything, however big or small it is. So, since the one is part of being, it is divided into as many parts as being, thus it is unfinished. The parts are themselves sections of a whole, the whole is delimited, confirming the presence of a beginning, a centre, and an end. Therefore, since the centre is itself at the same distance from the beginning and the end, the one must have a form: linear, spherical, or mixed. If the whole is in some of its parts, it will be the plus into the minus, and different from itself. The one is also elsewhere, it is stationary and in movement at the same time.

The Appendix to the First Two Deductions 155e–157b

Hypothesis/Deduction n. 3 (157b–159b): If the one is not. If the one is not it participates in everything different from it, so everything is partially one. Similarity, dissimilarity, bigness, equality and smallness belong to it since the one is similar to itself but dissimilar to anything that is, but it can be big or small as regards dissimilarity and equal as concerns similarity. So the one participates of non-being and also of being because you can think of it. Therefore, the one becomes and perishes and, since it participates of non-being, stays. The one removes from itself the contraries so that it is unnameable, not disputable, not knowable or sensible or showable. The other things appear one and many, limited and unlimited, similar and dissimilar, the same and completely different, in movement and stationary, and neither the first nor the latter thing since they are different from the one and other things. Eventually they are not. So if the one is not, being is not.

A satisfactory characterisation of this part of the dialogue has eluded scholars since antiquity. Many thinkers have tried, among them Cornford, Russell, Ryle, and Owen; but few would accept without hesitation any of their characterisations as having got to the heart of the matter. Recent interpretations of the second part have been provided by Miller (1986), Meinwald (1991), Sayre (1996), Allen (1997), Turnbull (1998), Scolnicov (2003), and Rickless (2007). It is difficult to offer even a preliminary characterisation, since commentators disagree even on some of the more rudimentary features of any interpretation. Benjamin Jowett did maintain in the introduction to his translation of the book that the dialogue was certainly not a Platonic refutation of the Eleatic doctrine. In fact, it could well be an Eleatic assessment of the theory of Forms. It might even mean that the Eleatic monist doctrine wins over the pluralistic contention of Plato. The discussion, at the very least, concerns itself with topics close to Plato's heart in many of the later dialogues, such as Being, Sameness, Difference, and Unity; but any attempt to extract a moral from these passages invites contention.

The structure of the remainder of the dialogue:

The Fourth Deduction 159b–160b

The Fifth Deduction 160b–163b

The Sixth Deduction 163b–164b

The Seventh Deduction 164b–165e

The Eighth Deduction 165e–166c

== Third Man argument ==
Plato's theory of Forms—as it is presented in such dialogues as the Phaedo, Republic and the first part of the Parmenides—seems committed to the principles listed below, where "F" stands for any property for which we posit a Form (forma being a Boethian translation for the Ancient Greek: εἶδος, romanized: eîdos, which latter word originally meant "appearance, shape"). Plato, in the Parmenides, uses the example "greatness" (μέγεθος) for F-ness; Aristotle uses the example "man". In what follows, the argument will be illustrated using μέγας (megas, "great"); however, the reasoning remains valid for any choice of F.

- One-over-Many: For any plurality of F things, there is a Form of F-ness by virtue of partaking of which each member of that plurality is F.
- Self-Predication: Every Form of F-ness is itself F.
- Non-Self-Partaking: No Form partakes of itself.
- Uniqueness: For any property F, there is exactly one Form of F-ness.
- Purity: No Form can have contrary properties.
- One/Many: The property of being one and the property of being many are contraries.
- Oneness: Every Form is one.

The Third Man argument (commonly abbreviated as TMA; Greek: τρίτος ἄνθρωπος) shows, in Parm. 132a–b, that these principles are mutually contradictory so long as there is a plurality of things that are F:

Begin, then, with the assumption that there is a plurality of great things—say, {A, B, C}. By One-over-Many, there is a Form of greatness (say, G_{1}) by virtue of partaking of which A, B, and C are great; by Self-Predication, G_{1} is great.

G_{1} may now be added to {A, B, C} to form a new plurality of great things: {A, B, C, G_{1}}. By One-over-Many, there is a Form of greatness (say, G_{2}) by virtue of partaking of which A, B, C, and G_{1} are great. But in that case, G_{1} partakes of G_{2}, and by Non-Self-Partaking, G_{1} is not identical to G_{2}. So there are at least two Forms of greatness, G_{1} and G_{2}. This already contradicts Uniqueness, according to which there is exactly one (and hence no more than one) Form of greatness.

The process, however, can continue, since—by Self-Predication—G_{2} is great as well; hence, G_{2} can be added to {A, B, C, G_{1}} to form yet another plurality of great things: {A, B, C, G_{1}, G_{2}}. By One-over-Many, there is a Form of greatness (say, G_{3}) by virtue of partaking of which A, B, C, G_{1}, and G_{2} are great. But in that case, G_{1} and G_{2} both partake of G_{3}; and by Non-Self-Partaking, neither G_{1} nor G_{2} can be identical to G_{3}—so there must be at least three Forms of greatness: G_{1}, G_{2}, and G_{3}.

Repetition of this reasoning shows that there is an infinite hierarchy of Forms of greatness, with each Form partaking of the infinite number of Forms above it in the hierarchy. According to Plato, anything that partakes of many things must itself be many; thus, each Form in the infinite hierarchy of Forms of greatness is many—and, given Purity and One/Many, it follows that each such Form is not one. This contradicts Oneness.

== Legacy ==
The Third Man argument was recounted by Aristotle (Metaphysics 990b17–1079a13, 1039a2; Sophistic Refutations 178b36 ff.), who attributed it to Plato; but—rather than retaining Plato's example, "greatness" (μέγεθος)—Aristotle uses "man" in his illustration of the argument (whence its name). Aristotle posits that if a man is a man because he partakes in the Form of Man, then a third Form would be required to explain how man and the Form of Man are both man, and so on, ad infinitum.

=== Ancient commentaries ===
The Parmenides was a frequent subject of Neoplatonic commentaries. Important examples include those of Proclus and of Damascius, and an anonymous 3rd- or 4th-century commentary possibly due to Porphyry. The 13th-century translation of Proclus' commentary by Dominican friar William of Moerbeke stirred subsequent medieval interest (Klibansky, 1941). In the 15th century, Proclus' commentary influenced the philosophy of Nicolas of Cusa, and the Neoplatonists Giovanni Pico della Mirandola and Marsilio Ficino penned major commentaries. According to Ficino:

While Plato sprinkled the seeds of all wisdom throughout all his dialogues, yet he collected the precepts of moral philosophy in the books on the Republic, the whole of science in the Timaeus, and he comprehended the whole of theology in the Parmenides. And whereas in the other works he rises far above all other philosophers, in this one he seems to surpass even himself and to bring forth this work miraculously from the adytum of the divine mind and from the innermost sanctum of philosophy. Whosoever undertakes the reading of this sacred book shall first prepare himself in a sober mind and detached spirit, before he makes bold to tackle the mysteries of this heavenly work. For here Plato discusses his own thoughts most subtly: how the One itself is the principle of all things, which is above all things and from which all things are, and in what manner it is outside everything and in everything, and how everything is from it, through it, and toward it. (in Klibansky, 1941)

=== Contemporary interpretations ===
Some scholars (including Gregory Vlastos) believe that the Third Man argument is a "record of honest perplexity". Other scholars think that Plato means us to reject one of the premises that produce the infinite regress, as it is possible to avoid the contradictions by rejecting Uniqueness and Purity while accepting One-Over-Many, Self-Predication, and Non-Self-Partaking, or vice versa (i.e., rejecting One-Over-Many, Self-Predication, or Non-Self-Partaking, but assenting to Uniqueness and Purity). Still others believe that the argument is fallacious from the construction of the second plurality, following from a proposed "dual predication" understanding of Self-Predication: if, e.g., G_{1} is not great in the same way as are the particulars that participate therein, no regress can even get started.

== Translations ==
- Burnet, J. Platonis Opera, Vol. II. Oxford University Press, 1903. ISBN 978-0-19-814541-7 (Greek with critical apparatus)
- Fowler, H. N. Plato, Vol. IV. Harvard University Press, 1926. Loeb Classical Library 167. ISBN 978-0-674-99185-9 (Greek and English)
- Zekl, H. G. Parmenides. Meiner Verlag, 1972. ISBN 978-3-7873-0280-2 (Greek and German)
- Allen, R. E. The Dialogues of Plato, Volume IV: Plato's Parmenides, Revised Edition. Yale University Press, 1997. ISBN 978-0-300-07729-2 (English with commentary)
- Cornford, F. M.. Plato and Parmenides. Routledge, 1939. ISBN 978-0-415-22517-5 (English with commentary)
- Gill, M. L., and P. Ryan. Plato: Parmenides. Hackett Publishing, 1996. ISBN 978-0-87220-329-7 (English with notes)
- Scolnicov, S. Plato's Parmenides. University of California Press, 2003. ISBN 978-0-520-22403-2 (English with commentary)
- Turnbull, R. The Parmenides and Plato's Late Philosophy. University of Toronto Press, 1998. ISBN 978-0-8020-4236-1 (English with commentary)
- Hermann, A., and S. Chrysakopoulou. Plato's Parmenides: Text, Translation, and Introductory Essay. Parmenides Publishing, 2010. ISBN 978-1-930972-20-9 (Greek and English, with English commentary)

== See also ==
- Phaedrus
- Theaetetus
- Sophist
- Philebus
- Hylomorphism
- Harold F. Cherniss, Plato scholar, defended Plato against the third man argument

== Sources ==
- Bechtle, Gerald (ed.) An anonymous commentary on Plato's Parmenides. Oxford 1996.
- Calian, Florian, "A Discussion on the Generation of Numbers in Plato’s Parmenides", in New Europe College, 2015, pp. 49–78.
- Cherniss, Harold: Parmenides and the Parmenides of Plato“, in: American Journal of Philology 53, 1932, pp. 122–138.
- Doull, James (1999). "The Argument to the Hypotheses in "Parmenides"" (PDF). Animus. 4. ISSN 1209-0689.
- Graeser, A. Prolegomena zu einer Interpretation des zweiten Teils des Platonischen Parmenides. Bern: Haupt, 1999.
- Graeser, Andreas: Platons Parmenides, Akademie der Wissenschaften und der Literatur, Mainz 2003
- Halfwassen, Jens: Der Aufstieg zum Einen: Untersuchungen zu Platon und Plotin, K.G. Saur Verlag, 2006.
- Klibansky, Raymond. "Plato’s Parmenides in the Middle Ages and the Renaissance: A Chapter in the History of Platonic Studies," Medieval and Renaissance Studies 1 (1941–3), 281–335.
- Kraut, Richard (eds). The Cambridge Companion to Plato. Cambridge. New York 1992.
- Lünstroth, Margarete: Teilhaben und Erleiden in Platons Parmenides. Untersuchungen zum Gebrauch von μετέχειν und πάσχειν Edition Ruprecht, Göttingen 2006, ISBN 978-3-7675-3080-5
- Malmsheimer, Arne: Platons Parmenides und Marsilio Ficinos Parmenides-Kommentar. Ein kritischer Vergleich (= Bochumer Studien zur Philosophie, Bd. 34), Amsterdam 2001. ISBN 90-6032-363-7 online.
- Matía Cubillo, G. Ó., "Suggestions on How to Combine the Platonic Forms to Overcome the Interpretative Difficulties of Parmenides Dialogue", Revista de Filosofía de la Universidad de Costa Rica, vol. 60, n. 156, 2021, pp. 156–171. ISSN 0034-8252, 2215-5589.
- Meinwald, Constance. "Goodbye to the Third Man" in Kraut pp. 365–396.
- Miller, Mitchell H. Jr. Plato's Parmenides: The Conversion of the Soul. Princeton 1986.
- Morrow, G.R., Dillon, J.M. (trs.), Proclus' commentary on Plato's Parmenides. Princeton University Press, 1987.
- Rickless, Samuel C.: Plato's forms in transition. A reading of the Parmenides, Cambridge 2007. ISBN 978-0-521-86456-5
- Ryle, Gilbert: „Plato's Parmenides II“, in: Mind 48, 1939, pp. 129–51, 303–25.
- Suhr, Martin: Platons Kritik an den Eleaten. Vorschläge zur Interpretation des platonischen Dialogs ‚Parmenides‘, Hamburg, 1969.
- Turner, John D., Kevin Corrigan (ed.), Plato's Parmenides and Its Heritage, Volume 1: History and Interpretation from the Old Academy to later Platonism and Gnosticism. Writings from the Greco-Roman World Supplements 2. Atlanta: Society of Biblical Literature, 2010.
- Zekl, Hans Günter: Der Parmenides, N.G. Elwert Verlag, Marburg/Lahn, 1971.
