= Mitchell Miller (philosopher) =

American philosopher

Mitchell H. Miller, Jr. is an American philosopher. He was, until his retirement in 2013, the Dexter Ferry Professor in Philosophy at Vassar College. The majority of his work concerns the late dialogues of Plato, but he has also written on Hesiod, Parmenides, and Hegel.

== Career ==
Mitchell “Mitch” Miller earned his bachelor's degree from Stanford University and his MA and PhD from the State University of New York at Buffalo. He joined Vassar’s Philosophy Department in 1972, rising to the rank of professor in 1984. He served as chair of the department from 1984 to 1987, in 1988, and again from 1994 to 1996. In 2009, he was appointed to the Dexter M. Ferry Jr. Chair.

Miller is an exponent of the significance of the so-called "unwritten teachings" of Plato, as Miller holds the controversial idea that Plato taught advanced concepts to his students at the Academy beyond those explicitly discussed by Socrates and other principal interlocutors in Plato's dialogues. The idea, which is dismissed by many Plato scholars, is based on a brief description of such teachings by Aristotle in his Metaphysics and Physics. The Seventh Letter, which was attributed to Plato in antiquity and is now the subject of debate concerning authenticity among scholars, also includes indications of such teachings. Miller has argued that evidence of these teachings can be found in the dialogues, but only through careful reading of structure and irony within them.

Miller's work has focused on several of the late dialogues, notably the Parmenides, Statesman, and Philebus, as well as the Republic. In his book on the Parmenides, Miller argues that the eight bewildering and contradictory hypotheses that end the dialogue form an ironic guide that allows the informed reader to interpret the whole, revealing through what Miller has called "psychagogy"—a transformation of the philosophical disciple's soul—the true nature of Plato's conception of the forms. That is, the ultimate purpose of the text is not to teach the reader didactically but to draw them into a different kind of thinking.

== Books ==
- The Philosopher in Plato's Statesman. The Hague: Martinus Nijhoff, 1980. Reprinted with additional material, Las Vegas: Parmenides, 2004, ISBN 978-1-930972-16-2
- Plato's Parmenides: The Conversion of the Soul. Princeton: Princeton UP, 1986. Reprinted University Park: Pennsylvania State UP, 1991.

== See also ==
- American philosophy
- List of American philosophers
