= Charicles =

5th-century BC Athenian politician, one of the Thirty Tyrants

Charicles (Ancient Greek: Χαρικλῆς), son of Apollodorus, was an ancient Athenian politician. In 415 BC he investigated the mutilation of the herms, and in 414/3 was made a general. In 411 Charicles became one of the Four Hundred, and he fled Athens after it fell; he returned in 404 and was one of the Thirty Tyrants. Along with Critias, he unsuccessfully forbade Socrates from speaking to men under the age of thirty. According to Aristotle he was one of the worst of the Thirty Tyrants.
