= Ancient Greek clubs =

Ancient Greek clubs (Greek: ἑταιρείαι, hetaireiai) were associations of ancient Greeks who were united by a common interest or goal.

== Types ==
The earliest reference of clubs in ancient Greece appears in the law of Solon, which is quoted in the Digest of Justinian I (47.22). This law guaranteed the administrative independence of such associations if they kept within the bounds of the law.

The Digest mentions these associations for religious practices, burial, trade, privateering, and communal meals. It also mentions demes, small settlements akin to villages or boroughs, citizen groups based on subdivisions of land, and phratries, kinship groups. Other than this law, information about the clubs have been found primarily on inscriptions, including those related to burial practices and common meals.

=== Political clubs ===
During the time span of 448 and 431 BC, that is between the end of Persian Wars and the start of the Peloponnesian War, there were political clubs called hetairiai, within both the oligarchic and democratic parties. Supposed members included: Themistocles, a leader in the Athenian democracy, (Plut. Anistides, 2); Pericles, a statesman, orator, and general of Athens, (Plut. Per. 7 and 13); Cimon, an Athenian statesman and general, who had a hundred club members, hetairoi, following him (Plut. Cim. 17). The purpose of these associations was to secure favourable results at elections and in the courts (Thuc. viii. 54). At this time their actions were not regarded as harmful or illegal by ancient Greek society.

The bitterness of party struggles in Greece during the Peloponnesian War meant that in many states they became a threat to local constitutions, and to democratic institutions. Aristotle mentions (Politics, p. 1310 a) a secret oath taken by the members of oligarchic clubs, containing the promise, "I will be an enemy to the people, and will devise all the harm I can against them." At Athens, the Athenian coup of 411 BC, a conspiracy against their democracy was engineered, in part, by these clubs, which existed there and in the other cities of the Delian League (Thuc. viii. 48 and 54). This is an example of how some of these political clubs had become secret conspiracies working outside the constitution.

=== Religious clubs ===
Ancient Greek religious clubs focused on the worship of a particular deity and had several names including thiasoi, eranoi and orgeones,. The thiasoi and orgeones clubs were often connected with deities foreign to the area and whose rites were of an orgiastic nature. These were deities that were not formally recognised and guaranteed by the state which meant no state provision was made for their worship.

Private individuals or groups had to provide priests, temples, sacrifices for non-state deities and this was the purpose of many of the religious clubs. The state, as the law of Solon shows, had no problem with the introduction of worship of foreign deities provided, it did not infringe the law and was not morally unwholesome. These religious clubs had all the rights of legal corporations.

There were clubs supporting the cults of foreign deities such as Sabazius, Mater Magna (see Great mother of the gods) and Attis, Adonis, Isis, Serapis, Men Tyrannos. These were especially prevalent in seaports like the Peiraeus, Rhodes, Smyrna. A passage in Demosthenes (de Corona, sect. 259 foll.) shows that the initiation at an early age in the rites of Sabazius did not gain credit for Aeschines in the eyes of the "best men". The members of these religious clubs included women, freedmen, foreigners and slaves but rarely people who held citizenship by birth. An inscription found by Sir Charles Thomas Newton at Cnidus contains a mutilated list of members of a thiasos includes apparently only one Cnidian citizen out of twelve, four slaves, and probably seven foreigners. This would suggest that it was the foreign population in the cities of Greece that tended to participate in this type of religious club.

==== Organisation ====
Much of the evidence for the organisation of religious clubs comes from inscriptions from Greece. The religious associations took on organizational forms in imitation of the constitution of the city in which they were based. The clubs had laws, an assembly and magistrates or officers (typically epimeletai, a tamias (treasurer) and a grammateus (secretary)), as well as priests or priestesses, and organised finances.

Rules regulated the conditions of admission, which involved an entrance fee and an examination as to character; the contributions, payable by the month, and the steps to be taken to enforce payment, e.g. exclusion in case of persistent neglect of this duty. Rules also governed the use to be made of the revenues, such as the building or maintenance of temple or club-house, and the cost of crowns or other honours voted by the assembly to its officers.

This assembly, in accordance with the law, elected its officers once a year, and these, like those of the state itself, took an oath on entering office, and gave an account of their stewardship at the end of the year. Le Guen examines epigraphic evidence for an organisation known as the 'Dionysian Technites'. Foucart discusses the 'orgeones' for the cult of the Mother of the Gods at the Peiraeus, and states that these clubs did not function in any sense as benefit clubs, or offer relief to the sick and needy.

Religious clubs increased in number and importance in the later periods of Greek history, and a large proportion of the inscriptions relating to them belong to the Macedonian and Roman empires. One of the most interesting, found in 1868, belongs to the 2nd century AD and reveals the worship of Men Tyrannos at Laurium. This Phrygian deity was introduced into Attica by a Lycian slave, employed by a Roman in working the mines at Laurium. He founded the cult and the eranos which was to maintain it, and seems also to have drawn up the law regulating its ritual and government. This may indicate how similar religious clubs were organised earlier in the period.

== See also ==
- Hetair-, a Greek linguistic root
- Syssitia
- Azoria, Crete (possible 6th-century BC andreion recovered in excavations at the site)
- Associations in Ancient Rome
- Religion in ancient Greece
