= Battle of Eretria =

Naval battle between Sparta and Athens (411 BC)

- Part of the Peloponnesian War
Date	September 411 BC
Location	off the coast of Euboea
Result	Spartan victory

Belligerents
Athens	Sparta

Commanders and leaders
Unknown	Hegesandridas

Strength
36 ships	42 ships

Casualties and losses
22 ships	Minimal

The naval Battle of Eretria, between Sparta and Athens, took place in September 411 BC, off the coast of Euboea.

== Background ==
During the spring of 411 BC, the Eretrians drove the Athenians out of Oropos with the help of the Boeotians. This city was a strategic point for Athens because it allowed them to control all of Euboea. Moreover, all the commercial traffic was made through the city. The Eretrians would hope that Sparta would help them to end the Athenian rule on Euboea.

== Battle ==
By the end of the summer 411 BC, a large Spartan fleet sailed towards Euboea. The Athenians tried to prevent the Euboeans from switching sides by sending a squadron to Eretria under Thymochares. However, the Eretrians supported the Spartans. While the Athenians were in the harbour of Eretria in order to supply themselves, the Eretrians informed the Spartan admiral Hegesandridas by a signal fire that it was an appropriate time to attack. The Athenians hurriedly embarked but were defeated during the naval battle which followed with the Athenians losing 22 ships. The Athenians who tried to take refuge in Eretria were killed by the town's inhabitants. Only those who decided to go to the Athenian fort in Eretria (which was likely on the Pezonisi Peninsula) survived.

== Aftermath ==
Following the battle, almost all of Euboea switched sides. Then there was a huge debate as to whether the Athenians would take them back, ending up in a massacre of Eretrians.

== See also ==
- Siege of Eretria

== Sources ==
- Swiss School of Archeology
