= Alexicles (general) =

5th-century BC Athenian general

- Native name: Ἀλεξικλῆς
- Allegiance: Athens
- Service years: 5th Century BC
- Rank: General
- Conflicts: Athenian coup of 411 BC

Alexicles (Ancient Greek: Ἀλεξικλῆς) was an Athenian general who belonged to the oligarchial or Lacedaemonian party at Athens. After the Athenian coup of 411 BC, he and several of his supporters left the city and went to Decelea and took refuge with Agis II, the king of Sparta. However, later he was imprisoned in Piraeus and sentenced to death for his role in the assassination of Phrynichus.
