= Peisander (oligarch) =

5th-century BC Athenian magistrate and politician

Peisander (fl. 429 - 411 BC) was an Athenian from the demos of Acharnae, who played a prominent part in the Athenian coup of 411 BC, which briefly replaced the Athenian democracy with an oligarchy controlled by a group called the Four Hundred.

== Character ==
Several of the Athenian comic poets mentioned him in unflattering terms. A fragment of the lost play The Babylonians (427 BC) by Aristophanes suggests that he was satirised in it as having been bribed to help bring about the Peloponnesian War (431–404 BC). A fragment of the Άστράτευτοι or Άνδρογύνοι of Eupolis says, Πείσανδρος εἰς Πακτωλὸν ἐστρατεύετο, Κἀνταῦθα τῆς στρατιᾶς κάκιστος ἦν ἀνήρ ("Peisander served at Pactolus, and was the worst man in the army"). Pactolus is a river in Lydia (in modern Turkey), fabled in antiquity for its gold.

It further appears from the Symposium of Xenophon that in 422 BC he shrank pusillanimously from serving in the expedition to Macedonia under Cleon. Meineke suggested that he may have been tried on a charge of ἀστρατείας γραφή (astrateias graphe, cowardice) (although there is no evidence for this); saying that that would explain the line in the Maricus of Eupolis, ἄκουε νῦν Πείσανδρος ὡς ἀπόλλυται ("listen now to Peisander perishing"). Meineke dates the play Peisander by the comic poet Plato, in which he was the main subject, to the same period. Aristophanes ridiculed him for trying to conceal his cowardice under a blustering manner. He gave further occasion for satire to Aristophanes, Eupolis, Hermippus and Plato by his gluttony and his unwieldy bulk, the latter of which procured for him the nicknames of ὀνοκίνδιος and ὔνος κανθήλιος ("donkey-driver" and "donkey"); appropriately, as the donkeys of Acharnae were noted for their size.

== Political career ==
In 415 BC, he was one of the commissioners (ζητηταὶ) who investigated the puzzle of the mutilation of the Hermae. He joined with Charicles in representing the outrage as connected with a conspiracy against the people, thus inflaming a popular fury. In 414 BC he was archon eponymos. Towards the end of 412, he was recorded as being the chief, or at least the ostensible chief, agent who instigated the revolution of the Four Hundred, having been sent about that time to Athens from the army at Samos to bring about the recall of Alcibiades and the overthrow of the democracy; or, rather, according to him, a modification of it. On his arrival, he urged these measures on his countrymen as their only means of obtaining the help of Persia, without which they could not hope to win advantage over their enemy the Lacedaemonians (Spartans); while ingenuously suggesting that the people would always have the option of restoring the former order afterwards. In this apparent emergency they consented, and gave Peisander and ten others discretionary power to negotiate with Tissaphernes (a Persian) and Alcibiades (an Athenian renegade). At his instigation they also removed the command of the fleet from Phrynichus and Scironides, who were opposed to the new movement; the former of whom he accused of having betrayed Amorges and caused the capture of Iasos.

Before he left Athens, Peisander organised a conspiracy among the several political clubs (hetairiai, έταιρίαι) for the overthrow of the democracy, and then proceeded on his mission. The negotiation with Tissaphernes failed, however, and he returned with his colleagues to Samos. There, he strengthened his faction in the army, and formed an oligarchical party among the Samians themselves. He then sailed again to Athens to complete his work there, establishing an oligarchy in every city where he landed. Five of his fellow envoys accompanied him, while the others were employed in the same way elsewhere. On his arrival at Athens with a body of heavily armed hoplites, drawn from some of the states he had revolutionised, he found that the clubs had almost effected his object already, principally by assassination and the general terror thus produced. When matters were fully ripe for the final step, Peisander made the successful proposal in the assembly for the establishment of the Four Hundred. In all the measures of this new government, of which he was a member, he took an active part, and when Theramenes, Aristocrates and others withdrew from it, he sided with the more violent aristocrats. He was one of those who, on the counter-revolution later in 411, took refuge with Agis (king of Sparta) at Deceleia. His property was confiscated, and he seems to have never returned to Athens.
