= 337 BC =

337 BC in various calendars
- Gregorian calendar: 337 BC; CCCXXXVII BC
- Ab urbe condita: 417
- Ancient Egypt era: XXXI dynasty, 7
- Pharaoh: Arses of Persia, 2
- Ancient Greek Olympiad (summer): 110th Olympiad, year 4
- Assyrian calendar: 4414
- Balinese saka calendar: N/A
- Bengali calendar: −930 – −929
- Berber calendar: 614
- Buddhist calendar: 208
- Burmese calendar: −974
- Byzantine calendar: 5172–5173
- Chinese calendar: 癸未年 (Water Goat); 2361 or 2154 — to — 甲申年 (Wood Monkey); 2362 or 2155
- Coptic calendar: −620 – −619
- Discordian calendar: 830
- Ethiopian calendar: −344 – −343
- Hebrew calendar: 3424–3425
- Hindu calendars
- Vikram Samvat: −280 – −279
- Shaka Samvat: N/A
- Kali Yuga: 2764–2765
- Holocene calendar: 9664
- Iranian calendar: 958 BP – 957 BP
- Islamic calendar: 987 BH – 986 BH
- Javanese calendar: N/A
- Julian calendar: N/A
- Korean calendar: 1997
- Minguo calendar: 2248 before ROC 民前2248年
- Nanakshahi calendar: −1804
- Thai solar calendar: 206–207
- Tibetan calendar: ཆུ་མོ་ལུག་ལོ་ (female Water-Sheep) −210 or −591 or −1363 — to — ཤིང་ཕོ་སྤྲེ་ལོ་ (male Wood-Monkey) −209 or −590 or −1362

Year 337 BC was a year of the pre-Julian Roman calendar. At the time it was known as the Year of the Consulship of Longus and Paetus (or, less frequently, year 417 Ab urbe condita). The denomination 337 BC for this year has been used since the early medieval period, when the Anno Domini calendar era became the prevalent method in Europe for naming years.

== Events ==
=== By place ===
==== Greece ====
- At a Pan-Hellenic Conference in Corinth, Philip II of Macedon announces the formation of the League of Corinth to liberate the Greek cities of Asia Minor from Persian rule, ostensibly because the Persian King, Arses, refuses to make reparations to Philip for Artaxerxes III's aid to the city of Perinthus when it was resisting Philip. All the Greek cities (except Sparta) and the Greek islands swear their support to the league and to recognise Philip as president of the League. Philip establishes a council of representatives from all the Greek states, which is empowered to deliberate and decide on the actions to be taken. However, the real power lies with Philip who is declared commander of the League's army.
- Olympias is put aside by her husband Philip II, following Philip's marriage to a girl named Cleopatra (who is renamed Eurydice). Their son, Alexander, is effectively disowned by Philip's actions. Philip II has Ptolemy, along with other companions of his son, exiled.

==== Roman Republic ====
- A plebeian is chosen to be praetor of Rome for the first time.
- Minucia, a Vestal Virgin, is convicted of unchastity.

==== Persia ====
- Mithridates II begins rule

== Births ==
- Demetrius I Poliorcetes ("Besieger"), Antigonid dynasty king of Macedon (d. 283 BC)

== Deaths ==
- Approximate date – Timoleon, Greek statesman and general (b. c. 411 BC)
- Shen Pu-hai, Chinese bureaucrat, chief minister of Han
