= Eëtioneia =

Promontory at the mouth of the Piraeus

Eëtioneia (Ancient Greek: Ἠετιώνεια or Ἠτιώνεια) is a narrow tongue of land commanding the entrance to the deep water harbors of Piraeus -- principally Kántharos -- which were highly strategic in the time of ancient Greece. It is situated opposite Cape Alkimos; ships entering the harbor found Eëtioneia to port and Cape Alkimos to starboard.

It was here that the forces of the Four Hundred oligarchs in the Athenian coup of 411 BC erected a fort in order to prevent the entrance of the naval fleet of Athens, which was opposed to them.

The fortress was razed in 404 BCE at the instigation of Theramenes, but later rebuilt around 395 or 394 BCE.

The Eëtioneia fortifications still survive today, with some ruins present in the Piraeus archaeological site.
