= Oenoe (Corinthia) =

Fortress in ancient Corinthia

Coordinates: 38°02′20″N 23°02′42″E

Oenoe or Oinoe (Ancient Greek: Οἰνόη) was a fortress in ancient Corinthia. It was in the district of Perea or Piraeus, east of the Isthmus of Corinth. There Agesilaus II of Sparta campaigned in 390 BCE, occupying Oenoe and the Heraion of Perachora. He left a garrison in the fortification, but Iphicrates of Athens subsequently seized the place.

The site of Oenoe is located at Viokastro, Schino.
