= Onomacles =

Late 5th-century BC Athenian general

Onomacles (Ancient Greek: Ὀνομακλῆς) was an Athenian general. During 412 BC Onomacles, together with two others, Phrynichus and Scironides, assumed command of a joint Athenian-Argive force.

== Battles ==
A battle was fought against Milesians supported by soldiers provided by Chalcideus and Tissaphernes. After this battle, Onomacles and his two allies prepared to besiege Miletus. This plan was thwarted by the arrival of a Peloponnesian and Sicilian fleet, and the three allies instead sailed away to Samos, after receiving advice from Phrynichus. Not long after, and within the same year, when the Athenians at Samos had been reinforced, Onomacles was dispatched with part of the armament, and with Strombichides and Euctemon, to fight against Chios.
