= Constitution of the Athenians (Pseudo-Xenophon) =

Treatise on classical Athens

The "Constitution of the Athenians" (Ancient Greek: Ἀθηναίων πολιτεία, Athenaion Politeia), also known as "On the Athenian State", is a short treatise on the government and society of classical Athens. Its date and authorship have been the subject of much dispute. The treatise discusses the organisation of the Athenian government, focusing particularly on the relationship between Athens' democracy and its status as a naval power.

== Authorship ==
Though the treatise was once attributed to Xenophon, amongst whose works it was preserved, it is now taken not to have been his work. Its authorship was already doubted by some in antiquity; Diogenes Laertius, who lists it among the works of Xenophon, notes that the first-century BC historian Demetrius of Magnesia disputed Xenophon's authorship.

The author of the work is sometimes referred to as the Old Oligarch – a name first used by Gilbert Murray. Scholars disagree on the author's political views. Though most see the work as sincere and the author as genuinely oligarchic, some have seen the work as an intellectual exercise by an author who does not sincerely believe the arguments that he advances.

Many scholars have tried to identify Pseudo-Xenophon with a known historical figure, though these attempts “have not yielded good results”. One possible author who has been frequently proposed is Critias, who would become one of the Thirty Tyrants in 404. However, there is little evidence to support this position, and Critias’ philosophy does not seem to match that of the Old Oligarch: for instance, the concept of justice proposed at Constitution 1.2 differs from Critias’ ideas on the subject.

== Date ==
Dates suggested for the Constitution of the Athenians range from as early as 443 to as late as 406 BC. Most scholars favour a date sometime during the Archidamian War (431–421 BC). A frequently cited terminus ante quem for the work is Brasidas’ expedition in 424; this was suggested by Roscher as having disproved the assertion at §2.5 that land powers could not send expeditionary forces far from home. However, Harold Mattingly argues that the work could in fact postdate this, as Brasidas' expedition was a drastic exception to the rule that land powers did not mount distant expeditions. In fact, Mattingly argues, there is evidence that the work was composed later than is usually thought: he argues that the festival of the Hephaistia, mentioned at §3.4, was instituted in 421/0 BC, puts the Constitution after Brasidas' expedition.

== Content ==
After an introduction in which the author lays out his thesis that, though he may dislike the Athenian system of government, he acknowledges that it is well-designed for its own purposes, the Old Oligarch begins to discuss specific aspects of the Athenian system and how they work to advance Athenian democratic interests.

The Constitution of the Athenians focuses on the interdependency between Athens’ naval supremacy and its democracy. The author discusses three features he considered characteristic of the Athenian democratic system. These were that the system benefited the common people, that it allowed social vices to be common, and that it was not interested in the pursuit of eunomia (“good order”).

== See also ==
- Constitution of the Athenians (Aristotle)
