= Astyochus =

5th-century BC Spartan navarch

Astyochus or Astyochos (Greek: Ἀστύοχος) was a Spartan navarch who served as commander of the collective Spartan naval forces along the coast of Asia Minor during 412–411 BC. He is regarded by many contemporaries and modern scholars as a key reason for Sparta's early failures in the Peloponnesian War. His expeditions consisting of encounters in Lesbos, Chios, Erythrae and Clazomenae all of which proved unsuccessful. He refused requests for help from Chios, causing the Spartan administration to become increasingly dissatisfied with his leadership. Thucydides portrayed Astyochus as timid and inept, and also depicted him as often in conflict with his peers in Ionia. Toward the end of his time as commander, he exhibited great reluctance to attack the Athenians and also failed to properly pay his troops, leading to riots and violence, and eventually, his removal as commander in 412 BC, to be replaced by the Spartan Mindarus.

== Involvement in the Peloponnesian War ==
In 412 BC, Astyochus replaced Melancridas as the leader of the naval forces, and was assigned to assist the cities on the mainland of Asia Minor, as well as the surrounding islands along the coast. His immediate task was to advance the Spartan agenda by weakening the allegiances of these communities to Athens, as well as to demonstrate through his presence Sparta's willingness to provide continued support and assistance. At this time, the Athenians had already lost their position in Sicily for a year, and had also just lost their foothold in Chios due to a revolt. Astyochus arrived off Chios with four galleys. However, Lesbos had recently transformed into a war zone, as the Chians had incited revolts in the key cities of Methymna and Mytilene. The Athenians stormed Mytilene in response, and Astyochus, upon his arrival, found that he could offer no help. The resulting Athenian recapture of Lesbos occurred as Astyochus withdrew to Chios.

Athens' next move was to launch an attack on Chios in an attempt to restore its sovereignty. The attack was so successful that some Chians began plotting and conspiring to restore Athenian leadership in Chios. Astyochus was then summoned by the government of Chios when they learned of news of the revolt and was tasked with neutralising the threat posed by the conspirators. The revolt was suppressed to some extent due to some of the conspirators being taken hostage by Astyochus and his Chian supporters. During this time, Theramenes, a Lacedaemonian, arrived in the region with a large fleet of 55 Peloponnesian and Sicilian ships for Astyochus to command. This reinforcement to the Spartan forces removed Astyochus' worry about the Chian revolt, so he turned his attention to Clazomenae, where he made an unsuccessful attempt to capture the city and its surrounds.

Following his failed attempt at Clazomenae, the Spartan representatives on Lesbos requested Astyochus' assistance in supporting a second uprising against Athens. While Astyochus was eager to provide help, he was nevertheless forced to return to Chios after the plans for insurrection were opposed by the Corinthians and other Spartan allies. Once back in Chios, Astyochus listened to new proposals for a revolt from the people of Lesbos. While Astyochus supported these new plans, he was once again forced into inaction as the plans were opposed by the Chians and Pedaritus, the commander of the Spartan land force. The opposition that he was receiving greatly angered Astyochus, and he vowed to never come to the assistance of the Chians again.

Astyochus then sailed to Miletus to take command of the Peloponnesian and Sicilian fleet which had been delivered by Theramenes. On his journey, he narrowly escaped capture by the Athenians and eventually assembled his forces at Miletus. In Miletus, a recently signed treaty between the kings of Persia and Sparta was revised with Astyochus' assistance. The revised treaty contained updated terms that were skewed toward Spartan interests. Meanwhile, Chios came under attack by the Athenians, prompting them to request aids from Miletus. However, because of his vow to no longer assist the Chians, Astyochus dismissed this request for assistance, causing Pedaritus to report his conduct to Sparta.

The worsening plight of the Chian position meant that Pedaritus continued to urge Astyochus for his aid while Chios could still be saved. However, when Astyochus was finally preparing his fleet to go to the aid of the Chians, he suddenly changed his mind and proceeded southwards to escort a fleet with 11 Spartan commissioners to Miletus. This fleet of 27 galleys and 11 commissioners had originated from Peloponnesus and were tasked with deciding whether to support or depose Astyochus.

On the journey to Miletus, Astyochus attacked and sacked the island of Cos. He then sailed to Cnidus, after defeating the Athenian admiral, Charminus, with minimal casualties. At Cnidus, the Spartan commissioners questioned Tissaphernes, a Persian satrap who was present under the Spartan-Persian alliance. The Spartan commissioners angering Tissaphernes so greatly that he left them soon after. It was around this time that Astyochus was said to have sold his services to Tissaphernes. Astyochus did not play a pivotal role in the successful revolt of the Rhodians from Athens supported by the united Peloponnesian fleet.

The increasing suspicion of the Spartans about Alcibiades' motives led to Astyochus receiving orders from Sparta to kill Alcibiades. However, Astyochus betrayed this agenda. When he received a letter from Phrynichus, the Athenian commander, informing him that Alcibiades was exerting influence over Tissaphernes to the detriment of Sparta, Astyochus instead travelled to Magnesia to deliver this letter to Alcibiades and Tissaphernes at their residence. Furthermore, when Astyochus received a second letter from Phrynichus offering to betray the Athenian stronghold at Samos, he once more provided the letter to Alcibiades and Tissaphernes.

Thucydides offered further evidence of Astyochus' defection to Tissaphernes: his submission to the pay cut of Peloponnesian sailors, and his lack of action in capitalising on the weakened and disorganised Athenian forces in Samos and the Hellespont during 411 BC. Astyochus not only failed to pay the troops, but also refused to attack the Athenians at Samos with the excuse that he was waiting for further reinforcements of Phoenician forces that Tissaphernes had promised. However, Astyochus eventually did set sail with 112 galleys to attack the Athenians at Samos, as he had faced strong pressure and complaints from the Syracusan sailors and the Peloponnesian soldiers at Miletus. Nevertheless, no battle ensued, and it is almost certain that Astyochus did not desire engagement with the Athenians.

Meanwhile, the troops' wages, both that of common soldiers and higher-ranked officers, continued to be neglected by Tissaphernes. Soon, Astyochus was charged with having sold the troops' interests to Tissaphernes, and Astyochus' threats towards some of the Syracusans demanding their wages only served to incite a riot, in which he was almost killed. It was at this point in time which Astyochus set sail for home, and was relieved of his duties after 8 months in command. He was succeeded by Mindarus, arriving from Sparta.
