= Antiphon (orator) =

5th-century BC Athenian orator

Antiphon of Rhamnus (/ˈæntɪfɒn, -ən/; Ancient Greek: Ἀντιφῶν ὁ Ῥαμνούσιος; 480–411 BC) was the earliest of the ten Attic orators, and an important figure in fifth-century Athenian political and intellectual life.

There is longstanding uncertainty and scholarly controversy over whether the Sophistic works of Antiphon and a treatise on the Interpretation of Dreams were also written by Antiphon the Orator, or whether they were written by a separate man known as Antiphon the Sophist. This article only discusses Antiphon the Orator's biography and oratorical works.

== Life ==
=== Early life ===
Antiphon was born around 480 and from an old wealthy family from the deme Rhamnus. Though Pseudo-Plutarch says he was born at the time of Persian wars in Live of the Ten Orators, Ostwald believed the date of Antiphon’s birth is inconsistent with the age when he began publishing his speeches, which is about sixty, and his involvement in the oligarchic revolution, which is about seventy. Therefore, he would lower Antiphon’s date of birth by a decade, which is 470. But scholars generally accepted the year of 480.

Antiphon’s father, Sophilus, was a Sophist who owned a school. So scholars consider he learned the skills of public speaking from his father. While Plutarch also mentioned he pursued the career of a teacher in his early days, some historians expected him to take over his father’s school when he grew up.

In addition to his sophist father, the political climate in his childhood fostered his interest in political and legal affairs. The institution of Athenian democracy was established around 450 or later, and Antiphon observed the development of democracy closely in his childhood. All these factors made him a renowned thinker in Athens. He also made opinions on various issues like geometry, cosmology, and the pseudo-science of dream interpretation.

=== Career ===
Antiphon was a statesman who took up rhetoric as a profession. He first started as a teacher teaching rhetoric and began his forensic career later. He wrote his early famous works of Tetralogies with his interest in the philosophy of justice and the Athenian legal system. He continued his teaching career afterward.

In the fifth century, public speaking was a common practice. The Greeks valued impromptu speaking over written discourse, Alcidamas argued in On Sophists that the best speeches are the ones ‘least like those are written.’ As a result, no speaker considered composing their speech for someone else or preparing it beforehand. Or even if there were written speeches, they failed to withstand the stringent requirements of Athenian or critical taste. Writing speeches was, therefore, a bold idea that was controversial at the time.

Antiphon became the first to write forensic speeches for publication. He was well-known for his love of money, as declared by Plato in his Peisandros. And the Archidamian War had left his family in poverty, so he looked for an additional occupation of composing speeches. As suggested by Thucydides, Antiphon ‘was reluctant to come forward in the assembly or on any other public stage. This, and a reputation for cleverness, meant that the people at large were suspicious of him: but for individuals consulting him about a case they had to argue in the law courts or the assembly he was the one man who could give them outstanding service.’ Antiphon acquired enough reputation to start his logographic business, fragments of his lost speeches revealed that Antiphon traveled far and had a wide range of acquaintances, including the general Demosthenes and Alcibiades as clients. There were arguments about whether he was the first logographer in Greece, there is no doubt that he was the first to write speeches for money.

He continued to educate, participate in complicated conversations and arguments, and converse with his friends about Athens' political issues in the final 20 years of his life. And more crucially, he stayed behind the scenes to counsel litigants. His chief business was that of a logographer (λογογράφος), that is a professional speech-writer. He wrote for those who felt incompetent to conduct their own cases—all disputants were obliged to do so—without expert assistance. Fifteen of Antiphon's speeches are extant: twelve are mere school exercises on fictitious cases, divided into tetralogies, each comprising two speeches for prosecution and defence—accusation, defence, reply, counter-reply; three refer to actual legal processes. All deal with cases of homicide (φονικαὶ δίκαι). Antiphon is also said to have composed a Τέχνη or art of Rhetoric.

=== Death ===
Antiphon was active in political affairs in Athens, and, as a zealous supporter of the oligarchical party, was largely responsible for the establishment of the Four Hundred in 411 (see Theramenes).

After the Athenians were defeated by Sparta in Sicily in 413, Antiphon and a group of aristocrats staged a coup led by four hundred oligarchs in 411. But this government was overthrown quickly as its chief proponent, Phrynichus, was assassinated. Members of the Four Hundred were charged for their involvement in an embassy to Sparta near the end of the Four Hundred brief rule. They were found guilty and given the following sentences: execution, property seizure, loss of burial privileges, and loss of citizenship rights for their descendants.

Although most of Antiphon’s acquaintances fled, he stayed in Athens and made his last speech for his defense, On the Revolution. Though some of the speech did not survive antiquity, leaving fragments of it what we have today, it was particularly admired by Thucydides, ‘Of all the men up to my time…he seems to me to have made the best defense in a capital case.’

Thucydides famously characterized Antiphon's skills, influence, and reputation:

...He who concerted the whole affair [of the 411 coup], and prepared the way for the catastrophe, and who had given the greatest thought to the matter, was Antiphon, one of the best men of his day in Athens; who, with a head to contrive measures and a tongue to recommend them, did not willingly come forward in the assembly or upon any public scene, being ill-looked upon by the multitude owing to his reputation for cleverness; and who yet was the one man best able to aid in the courts, or before the assembly, the suitors who required his opinion. Indeed, when he was afterwards himself tried for his life on the charge of having been concerned in setting up this very government, when the Four Hundred were overthrown and hardly dealt with by the commons, he made what would seem to be the best defence of any known up to my time.

— Thucydides, Histories 8.68

Antiphon was accused of treason and condemned to death. Even though the indictment involved the ambassador to Sparta, he denied potential motivations for the alleged crime of taking part in an oligarchic coup. He also addressed the more general accusation of taking part in the Four Hundred Coup and created a convincing case based on the likelihood that his line of work would flourish in a democracy. Given his inability to deny his obvious involvement in the coup, he might have continued by claiming that he wanted an enhanced democracy rather than an oligarchy.

In the end, Antiphon’s plea failed, and he was executed. Some scholars believed the aim of his speech was not to succeed but to present and leave for future generations a deft piece of sophistry regarding his role in the collapse of democracy.

Antiphon may be regarded as the founder of political oratory, but he never addressed the people himself except on the occasion of his trial. Fragments of his speech then, delivered in defense of his policy (called Περὶ μεταστάσεως) have been edited by J. Nicole (1907) from an Egyptian papyrus.

== Works ==
The accurate number of Antiphon’s works is vague as many of those are lost in antiquity. Callimachus cataloged his works together with other orators in the library at Alexandria. Pseudo-Plutarch records sixty speeches of Antiphon were preserved.

However, scholars criticized Callimachus for his carelessness in attributing authorship and for including numerous false works among the orators he cataloged. It is noteworthy that he included speeches and treaties like Truth in his collection of Antiphon. Additionally, Blass counts two of Antiphon’s books—On Truth, On Concord, the Politicus, and the Abuse of Alcibiades—as epideictic speeches. Caecilius declared that twenty-five of Antiphon’s sixty speeches were spurious, as his judgments were based on chronological and stylistic criteria^{[5]}, other scholars might not agree on his standards.

We currently have fifteen speeches, including three sets of Tetralogies, each with four speeches—two for defense and two for prosecution—and three individual forensic speeches to be delivered in an Athens court.

=== List of extant speeches ===
This is a list of extant speeches by Antiphon:

1. Against the Stepmother for Poisoning (Φαρμακείας κατὰ τῆς μητρυιᾶς)
2. The First Tetralogy: Anonymous Prosecution For Murder (Κατηγορία φόνου ἀπαράσημος)
3. The Second Tetralogy: Prosecution for Accidental Homicide (Κατηγορία φόνου ἀκουσίου)
4. The Third Tetralogy: Prosecution for Murder Of One Who Pleads Self-Defense (Κατηγορία φόνου κατὰ τοῦ λέγοντος ἀμύνασθαι)
5. On the Murder of Herodes (Περὶ τοῦ Ἡρῷδου φόνου)
6. On the Choreutes (Περὶ τοῦ χορευτοῦ)

=== Authenticity of the Tetralogies ===
As the Tetralogies have distinct historical, legal and stylistic features from the court speeches, many scholars had doubted its authenticity.

Dittenberger asserts that the Tetralogies assumed a legal system that was very dissimilar from Athens', and the tactics and approaches used by litigants were incongruous. He scrutinized how they differed from Antiphon’s court speeches. According to him, they were exercises meant to teach young men how to argue in court rather than being written by Athenians for Athenians. He also debated the unusual occurrence of several apparent Ionicisms in the Tetralogies, which are primarily written in the Attic dialect. They interpret this as proof that Ionian Greeks lived in Athens. While Antiphon was an Athenian, he could not be the author.

However, some other scholars suggested the Tetralogies are written speeches intended for a more scholarly audience rather than being delivered in court. Tetralogies are only works of fiction; their primary goal is not to persuade; rather, they concentrate on developing a smart and improbable argument that advances liberal education rather than professional training. Also, the format of opposing speeches allows Antiphon to match arguments against arguments in a way that was rare in actual speeches, so he could present the methods of argument and theoretical issues. This could not be presented in his court speeches, where the opponents might not always respond every point.

Regarding the linguistic issue, the use of Ionicisms could not serve as evidence from another writer. The incorporation of Ionicisms indicates that the intended audience was not limited to Athenians but also included foreigners, even though the Tetralogies were among the first Attic written works that we have. At the period, the writers were not constrained by factors like their hometown to write in a single, constant dialect.

Additionally, the sophists' spirit of experimentation and the intellectual pursuits of the second half of the fifth century BC were ideally suited to the Tetralogies' arguments. The work of the first rhetoricians, Coraz, Tisias, and Gorgias, can be compared to the First Tetralogy's arguments based on likelihood and the Second and Third Tetralogy's nexus of arguments about cause, effect, blame, and responsibility. They do fit well to the Athenian’s intellectual ideology at the time.

There is no reason to reject the attribution of Tetralogies to Antiphon, despite the fact that there are still a number of loopholes in the evidence supporting its veracity. Therefore, a majority of scholars regard them as works of Antiphon.

== Contribution ==
Antiphon’s practical and philosophical pursuits resulted in useful advice regarding litigation and forensic tactics, as well as creative intellectual studies in the dramatic format of trials, like the Tetralogies. Most significantly, his main contribution was writing forensic speeches for real-world applications, which became a significant cultural institution in fourth-century Greece and beyond. The great theoretical works of orators like Corax, Tisias, Gorgias, and others were turned into practical use and largely impacted the intellectual lives of many Athenians. Antiphon was the innovator of putting intellectual knowledge into legal use.
