= Phrynichus (oligarch) =

Athenian politician and general (died 411 BC)

Phrynichus (Ancient Greek: Φρύνιχος; died 411 BC) was an Athenian general (strategos) during the Peloponnesian War (431–404 BC), who supported the Athenian coup of 411 BC which briefly replaced the Athenian democracy with an oligarchy.

He was the son of Stratonides. In 412 BC, he was sent out with two others in command of a fleet of 40 ships to the coast of Asia Minor. The troops encamped in the territory of Miletus. A battle ensued in which the Athenians were victorious. A Peloponnesian fleet having arrived soon after, the colleagues of Phrynichus were for risking an engagement, from which Phrynichus (wisely, as Thucydides thinks) dissuaded them.

In 411 BC, proposals were made to the Athenians at the island of Samos on behalf of Alcibiades (an Athenian). He offered to secure Persian aid for them if an oligarchy was established instead of a democracy. Phrynichus again offered some sagacious advice, pointing out the dangers of such a course. He expressed his belief that Alcibiades was not at heart more friendly to an oligarchy than to a democracy. Phrynichus also had doubts as to whether Alcibiades had the ability to deliver on his promises. Peisander and the other members of the Athenian oligarchic faction, however, ignored his advice, and sent a deputation to Athens. Phrynichus, fearing for his safety in case Alcibiades should be restored, sent a letter to Astyochus (a Spartan), informing him of Alcibiades' machinations. Astyochus betrayed Phrynichus by passing on the communication to Tissaphernes (a Persian) and to Alcibiades. The latter complained to his Athenian friends about what he regarded as the treason of Phrynichus, and demanded that he should be put to death.

The 19th-century historian Connop Thirlwall could not decide whether Phrynichus' conduct was the result of a complete lack of caution, or a bold and subtle artifice. Phrynichus wrote again to Astyochus, offering to betray the Athenian armament into his hands. Once more Astyochus showed Phrynichus' letter to Alcibiades, who laid a fresh charge against Phrynichus. In the meantime, Phrynichus warned the Athenians that the enemy were preparing to surprise their encampment. He argued that the Alcibiades' charges against Phrynichus were groundless, and were based on personal enmity. Soon afterwards Peisander, wishing to get Phrynichus out of the way, procured his recall.

Subsequently, when the oligarchic faction found that the hopes held out to them by Alcibiades were groundless, and that they could get on better without him than with him, Phrynichus again joined them, and, in conjunction with Antiphon, Peisander, and Theramenes, took a prominent part in the revolution which led to the establishment of the oligarchy of the Four Hundred.

When considering how to respond to the meeting between Alcibiades and the Athenians at Samos, Theramenes and others counselled the oligarchs to make the best terms they could with their antagonists. However, Phrynichus was one of the foremost in opposing anything of that kind, and with Antiphon and ten others was sent to Sparta to negotiate a peace. On his return he was assassinated in the agora by a young Athenian, who was assisted by an Argive. The former escaped, but the latter was seized and tortured. It appeared that the assassination was the result of a conspiracy among those opposed to the oligarchs, but the latter decided that it was most prudent not to pursue the investigation. Lycurgus gives a different account of his assassination.
