= Theramenes =

Athenian statesman (died 404 BC)

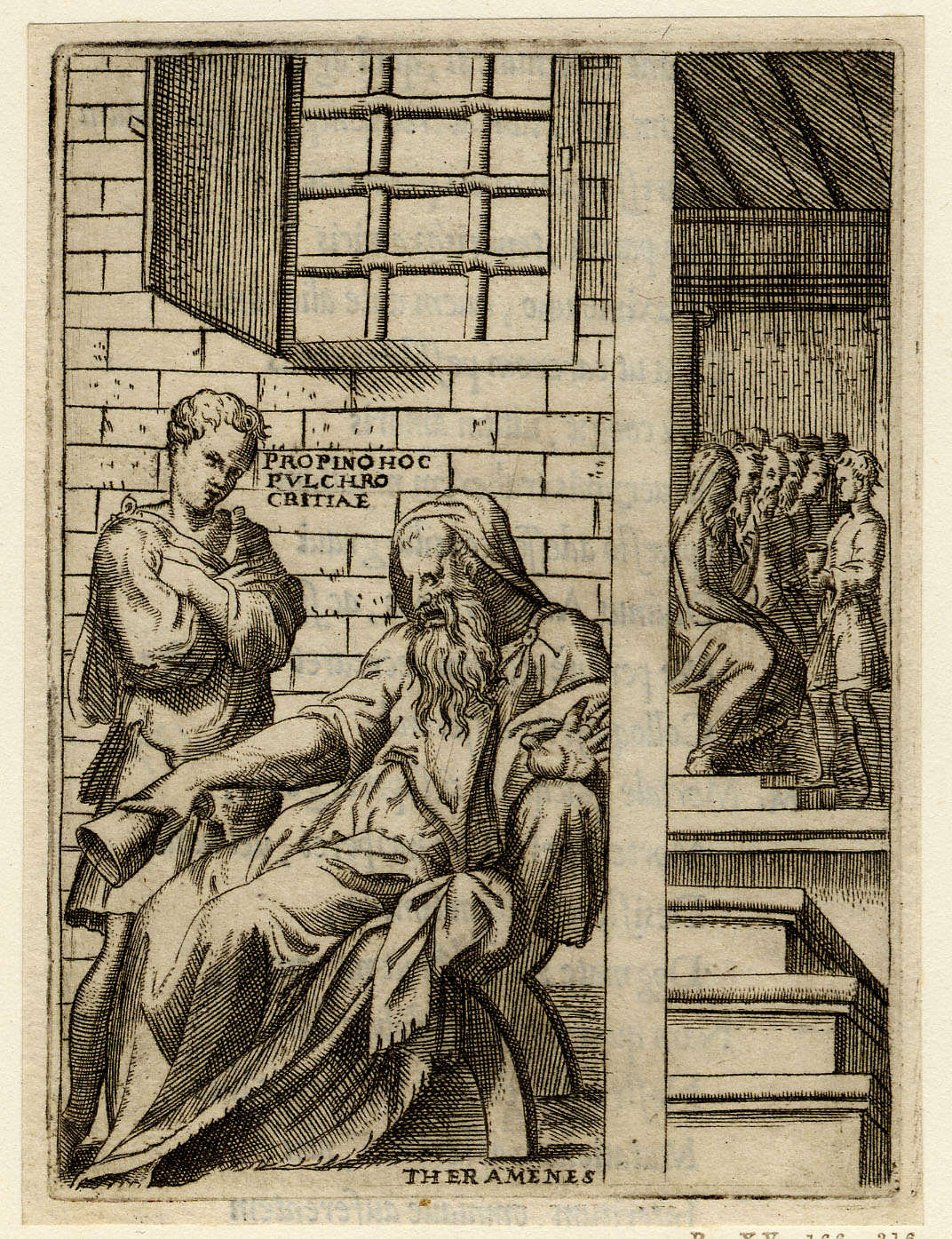
- 16th century engraving of Theramenes seated next to a young man emptying a flask.
- Native name: Θηραμένης
- Died: 404/403 BC Athens
- Allegiance: Athens
- Known for: Member of the Thirty Tyrants
- Conflicts: Peloponnesian War; Battle of Cyzicus; Battle of Arginusae

Theramenes (/θɪˈræmɪniːz/; Ancient Greek: Θηραμένης; died 404/403 BC) was an Athenian military leader and statesman, prominent in the final decade of the Peloponnesian War. He was active during the two periods of oligarchic government at Athens, the 400 and later the Thirty Tyrants, as well as in the trial of the generals who had commanded at Arginusae in 406 BC. A moderate oligarch, he often found himself caught between the democrats on the one hand and the extremist oligarchs on the other. Successful in replacing a narrow oligarchy with a broader one in 411 BC, he failed to achieve the same end in 404 BC, and was executed by the extremists whose policies he had opposed.

== Historical record ==
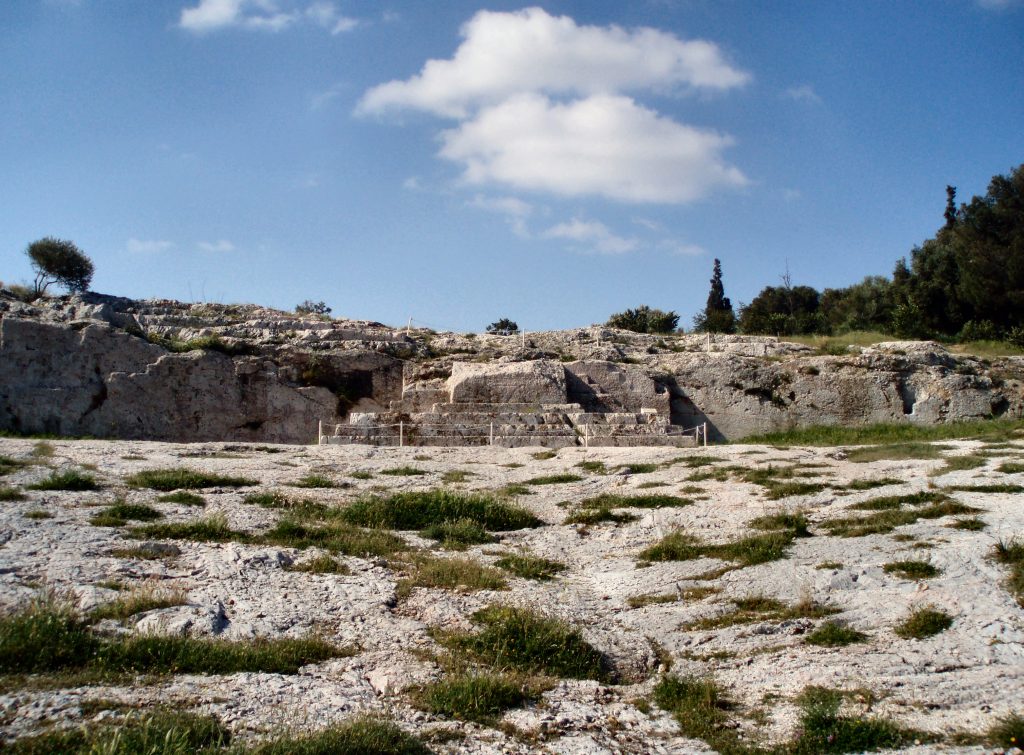
The Pnyx with speaker's platform in Athens, upon which Theramenes and other politicians stood while speaking.

No ancient biographies of Theramenes are known, but his life and actions are relatively well documented, due to the extensive treatment given him in several surviving works. The Attic orator Lysias deals with him at length in several of his speeches, albeit in a very hostile manner. Theramenes also appears in several ancient narrative histories: Thucydides' account includes the beginnings of Theramenes' career, and Xenophon, picking up where Thucydides left off, gives a detailed account of several episodes from Theramenes' later life, including a sympathetic and vivid description of his last actions and words; Diodorus Siculus, probably drawing his account mostly from Ephorus, provides another account that varies widely from Xenophon's at several points. Theramenes also appears in several other sources, which, although they do not provide as many narrative details, have been used to illuminate the political disputes which surrounded Theramenes' life and memory.

== Family ==
Only the barest outlines of Theramenes' life outside the public sphere have been preserved in the historical record. His father, Hagnon had played a significant role in Athenian public life in the decades before Theramenes' appearance on the scene. He had commanded the group of Greek colonists who founded Amphipolis in 437–6 BC, had served as a general on several occasions before and during the Peloponnesian War, and was one of the signers of the Peace of Nicias. Hagnon's career overlapped with his son's when he served as one of the ten commissioners appointed by the government of the 400 to draft a new constitution in 411 BC.

== Coup of 411 BC ==
=== Overthrow of the democracy ===
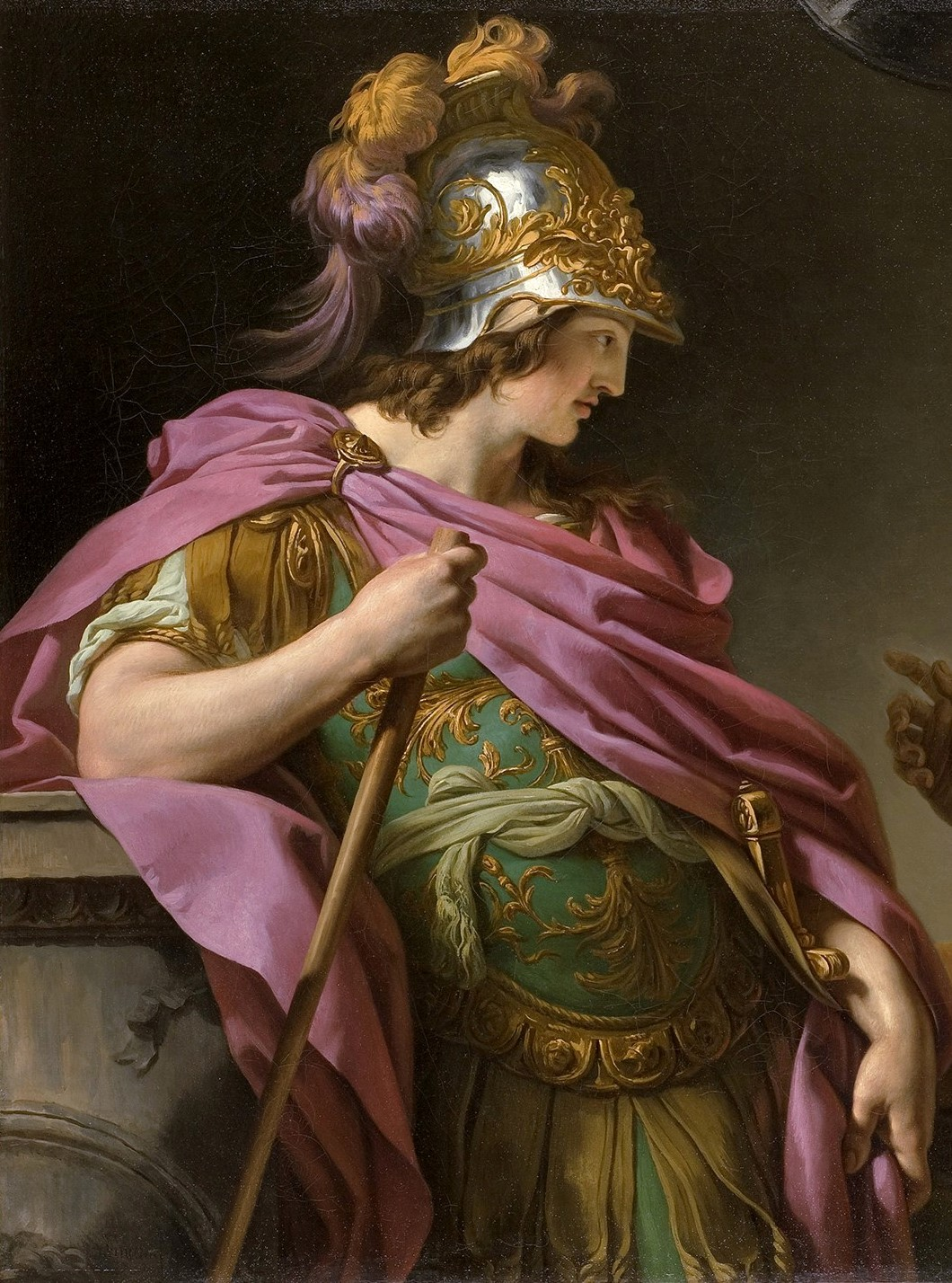
Alcibiades, shown here in this detail of a 1776 painting by François-André Vincent, incited the oligarchic coup by promising Persian support to Athens if the democracy was overthrown.

Theramenes' first appearance in the historical record comes with his involvement in the oligarchic coup of 411 BC. In the wake of the Athenian defeat in Sicily, revolts began to break out among Athens' subject states in the Aegean Sea and the Peace of Nicias fell apart; the Peloponnesian War resumed in full by 412 BC. In this context, a number of Athenian aristocrats, led by Peisander and with Theramenes prominent among their ranks, began to conspire to overthrow the city's democratic government. This intrigue was initiated by the exiled nobleman Alcibiades, who was at that time acting as an assistant to the Persian satrap Tissaphernes. Claiming that he had great influence with Tissaphernes, Alcibiades promised to return to Athens, bringing Persian support with him, if the democracy that had exiled him were replaced with an oligarchy. Accordingly, a number of trierarchs and other leaders of the Athenian army at Samos began planning the overthrow of the democracy. They eventually dispatched Peisander to Athens, where, by promising that the return of Alcibiades and an alliance with Persia would follow if the Athenians would replace their democracy with an oligarchy, he persuaded the Athenian ecclesia to send him as an emissary to Alcibiades, authorized to make whatever arrangements were necessary.

Alcibiades, however, did not succeed in persuading the satrap to ally with the Athenians, and, to hide this fact, demanded (claiming to be speaking for Tissaphernes) greater and greater concessions of them until they finally refused to comply. Disenchanted with Alcibiades but still determined to overthrow the democracy, Peisander and his companions returned to Samos, where the conspirators worked to secure their control over the army and encouraged a group of native Samian oligarchs to begin planning the overthrow of their own city's democracy. In Athens, meanwhile, a party of young oligarchic revolutionaries succeeded in gaining de facto control of the government through assassination and intimidation.

After making arrangements to their satisfaction at Samos the leaders of the conspiracy set sail for Athens. Among them was Theramenes; Thucydides refers to him as "one of the leaders of the party that put down the democracy—an able speaker and a man with ideas." Calling the assembly together, the conspirators proposed a series of measures by which the democracy was formally replaced with a government of 400 chosen men, who were to select and convene a larger body of 5,000 as time went on. Shortly afterwards, the conspirators went, under arms, to the council chamber, where they ordered the democratic council to disperse after collecting their pay; the council did as ordered, and from this point forward the mechanism of government was fully under the control of the oligarchic conspirators; they quickly changed the laws to reflect the new form of government they had imposed.

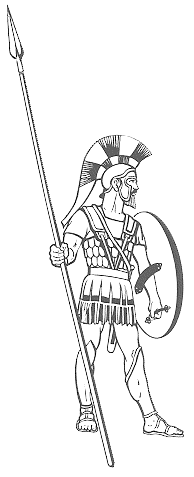
A Greek hoplite. In 411 BC, Theramenes argued for a government in which all men of hoplite status or higher would be enfranchised.

=== Conflict within the movement ===
At this point, several conflicts began to develop that threatened the future of the new government at Athens. First, the planned coup at Samos was thwarted by the efforts of Samian democrats and a group of Athenians who they entrusted with helping them. When the army at Samos heard the news of the coup at Athens, which arrived along with exaggerated reports of outrages being perpetrated by the new government, they declared their loyalty to democracy and hostility to the new government. At Athens, meanwhile, a split developed between the moderate and radical oligarchs, with Theramenes emerging alongside one Aristocrates son of Scelias as the leader of the moderate faction. The extremist faction, led by Phrynichus, containing such prominent leaders of the coup as Peisander and Antiphon, and dominant within the 400, opposed broadening the base of the oligarchy, and were willing to seek peace with Sparta on almost any terms. The moderates, on the other hand, although willing to seek peace with Sparta on terms that would preserve Athens' power, were not willing to sacrifice the empire and the fleet, and wanted to broaden the oligarchy to include the putative 5,000, presumably including all men of hoplite status or higher.

Shortly after taking power, the extremist leaders of the revolution had begun constructing fortifications on Eëtioneia, a dominant point in the entrance to the harbor of Piraeus, ostensibly to protect the harbor against an attack from the fleet at Samos. With internal dissent increasing, they joined these new fortifications to existing walls to form a redoubt defensible against attacks from land or sea, which contained a large warehouse into which the extremists moved most of the city's grain supply. Theramenes protested strongly against the building of this fortification, arguing that its purpose was not to keep the democrats out, but to be handed over to the Spartans; Thucydides testifies that his charges were not without substance, as the extremists were actually contemplating such an action. Initially cautious (as enemies of the regime had been executed before), Theramenes and his party were emboldened and galvanized into action by several events. First, a Peloponnesian fleet, ostensibly dispatched to assist anti-Athenian forces on Euboea, was moving slowly up the coast of the Peloponnese; Theramenes charged that this fleet was planning to seize the fortifications on Eetioneia, in collaboration with the extremists. Second, an Athenian militiaman, apparently acting on orders from conspirators higher in the ranks of the government, assassinated Phrynichus, the leader of the extremist faction. He escaped, but his accomplice, an Argive, was captured; the prisoner, under torture, refused to state the name of his employer. With the extremists unable to take effective action in this case, and with the Peloponnesian fleet overrunning Aegina (a logical stopping point on the approach to Piraeus), Theramenes and his party decided to act.

Aristocrates, who was commanding a regiment of hoplites in Piraeus, arrested the extremist general Alexicles; enraged, the extremist leaders of the 400 demanded action, and made a number of threats against Theramenes and his party. To their surprise, Theramenes volunteered to lead a force to rescue Alexicles; the leaders of the extremists acquiesced, and Theramenes set out to Piraeus, sharing his command with one other moderate and one extremist, Aristarchus. When Theramenes and his force arrived at Piraeus, Aristarchus, in a rage, exhorted the men to attack the hoplites who had seized Alexicles. Theramenes feigned rage as well, but when asked by the hoplites whether he thought that the fortification on Eetioneia was a good idea, he responded that if they wanted to pull it down, he thought that would be good. Calling out that everyone who wanted the 5,000 to govern instead of the 400, the hoplites set to work. Donald Kagan has suggested that this call was probably instigated by Theramenes' party, who wanted the 5,000 to govern; the hoplites tearing down the fortification might well have preferred a return to the democracy. Several days later, the Peloponnesian fleet approached Piraeus, but, finding the fortifications destroyed and the port well defended, they sailed on to Euboea. Several days later, the 400 were formally deposed and replaced by a government of the 5,000; the most extreme of the oligarchs fled the city.

== In command ==
Athenian naval strategy at the battle of Cyzicus: Alcibiades' decoy force draws the Spartan fleet out into open water, and then turns about to engage them. Squadrons commanded by Thrasybulus and Theramenes move in behind the Spartan ships, to cut off their line of retreat, trapping the Spartans between three groups of Athenian warships; a much larger force than they had initially expected to engage.

Under the government of the 5,000 and under the democracy that replaced it in 410 BC, Theramenes served as a general for several years, commanding fleets in the Aegean Sea and the Hellespont. Shortly after the rise of the government of the 5,000, Theramenes set sail to the Hellespont to join Thrasybulus and the generals elected by the army at Samos. After the Athenian victory at Abydos, he took thirty triremes to attack the rebels on Euboea, who were building a causeway to Boeotia to provide land access to their island. Unable to stop the construction, he plundered the territory of several rebellious cities, then travelled around the Aegean suppressing oligarchies and raising funds from various cities of the Athenian Empire. He then took his fleet to Macedon, where he assisted the Macedonian king Archelaus in his siege of Pydna, but, with that siege dragging on, he sailed on to join Thrasybulus in Thrace. The fleet soon moved on from there to challenge Mindarus' fleet, which had seized the city of Cyzicus. Theramenes commanded one wing of the Athenian fleet in the resulting Battle of Cyzicus, a decisive Athenian victory. In that battle, Alcibiades (who had been recalled from exile by the fleet at Samos shortly after the coup) led a decoy force that drew the Spartan fleet out into open water, while Thrasybulus and Theramenes, each commanding an independent squadron, cut off the Spartans' retreat. Mindarus was forced to flee to a nearby beach, and vicious fighting ensued on land as the Athenians attempted to drag off the Spartan ships. Thrasybulus and Alcibiades kept the Spartans occupied while Theramenes joined up with the nearby Athenian land forces and then hurried to the rescue; his arrival precipitated a total Athenian victory, in which all the Spartan ships were captured. In the wake of this victory, the Athenians captured Cyzicus and constructed a fort at Chrysopolis, from which they extracted a customs duty of one tenth on all ships passing through the Bosporus. Theramenes and another general remained at this fort with a garrison of thirty ships to oversee the collection of the duty. At Athens, meanwhile, the government of the 5,000 was replaced by a restored democracy within a few months of this battle; Donald Kagan has suggested that the absence of Theramenes, "the best spokesman for the moderates", paved the way for this restoration.

According to Diodorus and Plutarch, Theramenes participated under the command of Alcibiades to the siege of Byzantium (408 BC), winning the battle against the Peloponnesian army that was appointed to defend that city: Alcibiades was in command of the right wing, while Theramenes was in charge of the left one.

== Arginusae ==
Theramenes remained a general through 407 BC, but, in that year, when the Athenian defeat at Notium led to the downfall of Alcibiades and his political allies, Theramenes was not reelected. In the next year, however, he did sail as a trierarch in the scratch Athenian relief fleet sent out to relieve Conon, who had been blockaded with 40 triremes at Mytilene by Callicratidas. That relief force won a surprising victory over the more experienced Spartan force in the Battle of Arginusae, but in the wake of that battle Theramenes found himself in the middle of a massive controversy. At the end of the battle, the generals in command of the fleet had conferred to decide on their next steps. Several pressing concerns presented themselves; 50 Peloponnesian ships under Eteonicus remained at Mytilene, blockading Conon, and decisive action by the Athenians could lead to the destruction of that force as well, but, at the same time, ships needed to be dispatched to recover the sailors of the twenty five Athenian triremes sunk or disabled in the battle. Accordingly, all eight generals, with the larger part of the fleet, set out for Mytilene, while a rescue force under Thrasybulus and Theramenes, both of whom were trierarchs in this battle but had served as generals in prior campaigns, remained behind to pick up the survivors and retrieve corpses for burial. At this point, however, a severe storm blew up, and both of these forces were driven back to shore. Eteonicus escaped, and a great number of Athenian sailors—estimates as to the precise figure have ranged from near 1,000 to as many as 5,000—drowned.

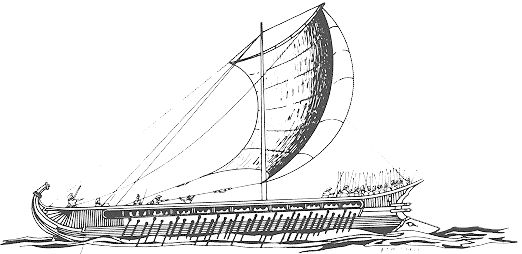
An ancient Greek trireme. Twenty-five Athenian triremes were disabled or sunk at Arginusae, and Theramenes was detailed to rescue the survivors.

Soon after the news of this public tragedy reached Athens, a massive controversy erupted over the apportionment of blame for the botched rescue. The public was furious over the loss of so many sailors, and over the failure to recover the bodies of the dead for burial, and the generals suspected that Thrasybulus and Theramenes, who had already returned to Athens, might have been responsible for stirring up the assembly against them, and wrote letters to the people denouncing the two trierarchs as responsible for the failed rescue. Thrasybulus and Theramenes were called before the assembly to defend their behavior; in their defense, Theramenes produced a letter from the generals in which they blamed only the storm for the mishap; the trierarchs were exonerated, and public anger now turned against the generals. All eight were deposed from office, and summoned back to Athens to stand trial. Two fled, but six returned as commanded to face the charges against them.

Diodorus notes that the generals committed a critical error by attempting to shift the blame onto Theramenes. "For," he states, "although they could have had the help of Theramenes and his associates in the trial, men who both were able orators and had many friends and, most important of all, had been participants in the events relative to the battle, they had them, on the contrary, as adversaries and bitter accusers." When the trial came, Theramenes' numerous political allies were among the leaders of the faction seeking the generals' conviction. A bitter series of debates and legal maneuvers ensued as the assembly fought over what to do with the generals. At first, it appeared that they might be treated leniently, but in the end, public displays of bereavement by the families of the deceased and aggressive prosecution by a politician named Callixenus swung the opinion of the assembly; the six generals were tried as a group and executed. The Athenian public, as the grief and anger prompted by the disaster cooled, came to regret their action, and for thousands of years historians and commentators have pointed to the incident as perhaps the greatest miscarriage of justice the city's government ever perpetrated.

== Negotiating a peace ==
In 405 BC, the Athenian navy was defeated and destroyed by the Peloponnesian fleet under Lysander at the Battle of Aegospotami in the Hellespont. Without sufficient funds to build another fleet, the Athenians could only wait as Lysander sailed westward across the Aegean towards their city. Blockaded by land and sea, with their food supplies running low, the Athenians sent ambassadors to the Spartan king Agis, whose army was camped outside their walls, offering to join the Spartan alliance if they were allowed to keep their walls and port; Agis, claiming that he had no power to negotiate, sent the ambassadors on to Sparta, but there they were told that, if they really wanted peace, they should bring the Spartans better proposals. The Athenians were initially intransigent, going so far as to imprison a man who suggested that a stretch of the long walls be torn down as the Spartans had insisted, but the reality of their situation soon compelled them to consider compromises. In this situation, Theramenes, in a speech to the assembly, requested that he be sent as an ambassador to Lysander (who was at this time besieging Samos) to determine the Spartans' intentions towards Athens; he also stated that he had discovered something that might improve the Athenians' situation, although he declined to share it with the citizenry. His request was granted, and Theramenes sailed to Samos to meet with Lysander; from there, he was sent to Sparta, perhaps stopping at Athens on the way. At Sparta, with representatives of all of Sparta's allies present, Theramenes and his colleagues negotiated the terms of the peace that ended the Peloponnesian War; the long walls and the walls of Piraeus were pulled down, the size of the Athenian fleet was sharply limited, and Athenian foreign policy was subordinated to that of Sparta; the treaty also stipulated that the Athenians were to use "the constitution of their ancestors". Theramenes returned to Athens and presented the results of the negotiations to the assembly; although some still favored holding out, the majority voted to accept the terms; the Peloponnesian War, after 28 years, was at an end.

== Thirty Tyrants ==
In the wake of Athens' surrender, the long walls were torn down and the troops besieging the city returned to their various homes; a Spartan garrison probably remained in Athens to supervise the dismantling of the walls; Lysander sailed off to Samos to complete the siege of that city. Another clause of the treaty that had ended the war had allowed all exiles to return to Athens, and these men, many of them oligarchic agitators who had been cast out by the democracy, were hard at work in the months after the treaty. Five "overseers" were appointed by the members of the oligarchic social clubs to plan the transition to an oligarchy. In July 404 BC, they summoned Lysander back to Athens, where he supervised the change of government; an oligarchic politician, Dracontides, proposed in the council to place the government in the hands of thirty chosen men; Theramenes supported this motion, and, with Lysander threatening to punish the Athenians for failing to dismantle the walls quickly enough unless they assented, it passed the assembly. Thirty men were selected: ten appointed by the "overseers", ten chosen by Theramenes (including himself), and ten picked by Lysander.

This government, which soon came to be known as the "Thirty Tyrants" for its excesses and atrocities, rapidly set about establishing its control over the city. The oligarchs, led by Critias, one of the "overseers" and a former exile, summoned a Spartan garrison to ensure their safety and then initiated a reign of terror, executing any men who they thought might possess sufficient initiative or a large enough following to effectively challenge them. It was this campaign that first drove a wedge between Theramenes and the leaders of the Thirty; initially a supporter of Critias, Theramenes now argued that it was unnecessary to execute men who had shown no sign of wishing the oligarchy harm just because they had been popular under the democracy. This protest, however, failed to slow the pace of the executions, so Theramenes next argued that, if the oligarchy was to govern by force, it must at least expand its base; fearful that Theramenes might lead a popular movement against them, Critias and the leaders of the Thirty issued a list of 3,000 men who would be associates in the new government. When Theramenes again objected that this number was still too small, the leaders arranged for a military review to be staged after which the citizens were ordered to pile their arms; with the help of the Spartan garrison, the oligarchs then confiscated all arms except those belonging to the 3,000. This, in turn, marked the beginning of even greater excesses; to pay the Spartan garrison's wages, Critias and the leaders ordered each of the Thirty to arrest and execute a metic, or resident alien, and confiscate his property. Theramenes, protesting that this action was worse than the worst excesses of the democracy, refused to follow the order.

Critias and his compatriots, in the light of these events, decided that Theramenes had become an intolerable threat to their rule; accordingly, speaking before the assembly of the 3,000, Critias denounced Theramenes as a born traitor, always ready to shift his political allegiances with the expediencies of the moment. Famously, he branded him with the nickname "cothurnus", the name of a boot worn on the stage that could fit either foot; Theramenes, he proclaimed, was ready to serve either the democratic or oligarchic cause, seeking only to further his own personal interest. In an impassioned response, Theramenes denied that his politics had ever been inconsistent. He had always, he insisted, favored a moderate policy, neither extreme democracy nor extreme oligarchy, and held true to the ideal of a government composed of men of hoplite status or higher, who would be able to effectively serve the state. This speech had a substantial effect on the audience, and Critias saw that, if the case were brought to a vote, Theramenes would be acquitted. Accordingly, after conferring with the Thirty, Critias ordered men with daggers to line the stage in front of the audience and then struck Theramenes' name from the roster of the 3,000, denying him his right to a trial. Theramenes, springing to a nearby altar for sanctuary, admonished the assemblage not to permit his murder, but to no avail; the Eleven, keepers of the prison, entered, dragged him away, and forced him to drink a cup of hemlock. Theramenes, imitating a popular drinking game in which the drinker toasted a loved one as he finished his cup, downed the poison and then flung the dregs to the floor, exclaiming "Here's to the health of my beloved Critias!"

== Historiography ==
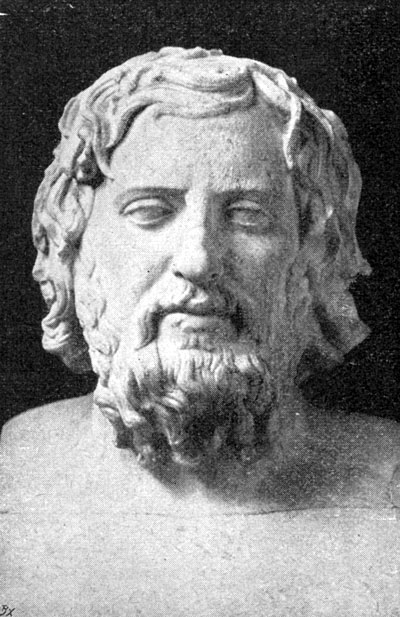
The historian Xenophon wrote a scathing account of Theramenes' actions after Arginusae, but portrayed his resistance to the Thirty Tyrants favorably.

Theramenes lived a controversial life, and his death did not end the struggle over how to interpret his actions. In the years after his death, his reputation became an item of contention as former associates of his defended themselves against prosecutors under the restored democracy. (The regime of the Thirty lasted only until 403 BC.) It would appear that, as they defended themselves before democratic-sympathizing Athenian jurymen, Theramenes' former comrades in the oligarchy attempted to exculpate themselves by associating their actions with those of Theramenes and portraying him as a steadfast defender of the Athenian democracy; examples of such accounts can be found in the Histories of Diodorus Siculus and in the "Theramenes papyrus", a fragmentary work discovered in the 1960s. An example of the sort of attack this portrayal was intended to defend against can be found in two orations of Lysias, Against Eratosthenes and Against Agoratus; there, Theramenes is portrayed as treasonous and self-interested, doing tremendous harm to the Athenian cause through his machinations. Xenophon adopts a similarly hostile attitude in the early parts of his work, but apparently had a change of heart during the chronological break in composition that divides the second book of the Hellenica; his portrayal of Theramenes during the reign of the Thirty Tyrants is altogether more favorable than that of his earlier years. A final portrayal is offered by Aristotle, who, in his Constitution of the Athenians, portrays Theramenes as a moderate and a model citizen; historians have disputed the origin of this account, with some treating it as a product of 4th-century BC propaganda by a moderate "Theramenean" party, while others, such as Phillip Harding, see no evidence for such a tradition and argue that Aristotle's treatment of Theramenes is entirely a product of his own reassessment of the man. Diodorus Siculus, a historian active in the time of Caesar, presents a generally favorable account of Theramenes, which appears to be drawn from the noted historian Ephorus, who studied in Athens under Isocrates who was taught by Theramenes.

Theramenes' reputation has undergone a dramatic shift since the 19th century, when Xenophon's and Lysias' unfavorable accounts were widely accepted, and Theramenes was execrated as a turncoat and blamed for instigating the execution of the generals after Arginusae. The discovery of Aristotle's Constitution of the Athenians in 1890 reversed this trend for the broad assessment of Theramenes' character, and Diodorus' account of the Arginusae trial has been preferred by scholars since Antony Andrewes undermined Xenophon's account in the 1970s; Diodorus' more melodramatic passages, such as his elaborate presentation of Theramenes' last moments, are still discounted, but he is now preferred on a number of issues, and on the Arginusae trial in particular. Aristophanes, in The Frogs, pokes fun at Theramenes' ability to extricate himself from tight spots, but delivers none of the scathing rebukes one would expect for a politician whose role in the shocking events after Arginusae had been regarded as particularly blameworthy, and modern scholars have seen in this a more accurate depiction of how Theramenes was perceived in his time; Lysias, meanwhile, who mercilessly attacks Theramenes on many counts, has nothing negative to say about the aftermath of Arginusae.

Recent works have generally accepted the image of Theramenes as a moderate, committed to the ideal of a hoplite-based broad oligarchy. Donald Kagan has said of him that "...his entire career reveals him to be a patriot and a true moderate, sincerely committed to a constitution granting power to the hoplite class, whether in the form of a limited democracy or a broadly based oligarchy", while John Fine has noted that "like many a person following a middle course, he was hated by both political extremes." The constitution of the 5,000 is recognized as his political masterpiece; his attempt to bring about a similar shift towards moderatism in 404 led directly to his death. That death, meanwhile, has become famous for its drama, and the story of Theramenes' final moments has been repeated over and over throughout classical historiography. "Because he met his death defying a tyrant," John Fine notes, "it is easy to idealize Theramenes." In the millennia since his death, Theramenes has been both idealized and reviled; his brief seven-year career in the spotlight, especially in the last years of the Peloponnesian War, has been subject to myriad different interpretations.
