= Athenian coup of 411 BC =

'The Four Hundred' oligarchy replaces the democratic government

Athenian coup
- Part of Peloponnesian War
- Date: June 9, 411 BC
- Location: Athens
- Caused by: A fiscal crisis caused by the failure of the Sicilian Expedition
- Goals: Replace the democracy with an oligarchy
- Result: Coup successful: Alcibiades returns from exile; Oligarchy replaces the democratic government of Athens

Parties
The Four Hundred: Extremists; Moderates	Government of Athens

Lead figures
Alcibiades; Theramenes; Antiphon (executed); Phrynichus X	Thrasybulus; Thrasyllus

The Athenian coup of 411 BC was the result of a revolution that took place during the Peloponnesian War between Athens and Sparta. The coup overthrew the democratic government of ancient Athens and replaced it with a short-lived oligarchy known as the Four Hundred.

In the wake of the financial crisis caused by the failed Sicilian Expedition of the Athenian military in 413 BC, some high-status Athenian men, who had disliked the broad-based democracy of the city-state for a long time, sought to establish an oligarchy of the elite. They believed that they could manage foreign, fiscal, and war policies better than the existing government.

The movement toward oligarchy was led by a number of prominent and wealthy Athenians, who held positions of power in the Athenian army at Samos in coordination with Alcibiades.

== Background ==
By the time of the Peloponnesian War, the democracy in Athens was approximately 100 years old. Most of the upper class accepted this form of government, while either vying for positions of leadership within it or, remaining aloof outside of it. Until the war, most of the leading Athenian politicians had come from noble families. The democratic form of government in the city-state of Athens remained an anomaly, however, as the rest of the Greek city-states were run either as tyrannies or, most often, by oligarchies. Both Thucydides and Aristotle wrote that "the revolution was provoked by defeat in Sicily."

=== Aristocratic cultural influences ===
Despite the democracy in Athens, Greek tradition remained aristocratic, and the works of Homer celebrated an aristocratic worldview, in which the nobles made decisions and the commoners obeyed.

The poems of Theognis of Megara (from the sixth century BC) and the Theban poet Pindar (of the fifth century BC) were popular among the Athenian nobles at this time, casting democracy as an immoral and unfair situation where the good (i.e., those of noble birth) were artificially forced into equality with the base (i.e., those of common birth). These poems maintained that virtues such as judgment, moderation, restraint, justice, and reverence could not be taught, and that such inborn qualities were limited to a few, leaving the rest "shameless and arrogant". These poets compared the masses to the noble born, who were supposedly inherently superior. It was implied that the gap between them could not be overcome by education.

During the war, a pamphlet titled Constitution of the Athenians was produced and credited to an author now known as the "Old Oligarch". The author derided democracy, writing, "As for the constitution of the Athenians, I do not praise them for having chosen it, because in choosing it they have given the better of it to the vulgar people (poneroi) rather than to the good (chrestoi)." The constitution established a system that assigned safe, salaried positions by random lot; but left the hazardous jobs, such as those of the generals and cavalry commanders, to election of "the best qualified." In contrast, such men praised the eunomia ("good law") of the constitutions of Sparta and Corinth. They longed for a time when Athens would adopt the ways of its neighbours and allow only "the best and most qualified" to deliberate public affairs and make the laws. They held that in such a situation the people would "fall into servitude" naturally.

=== Fiscal burden ===
The Peloponnesian war had brought on unprecedented fiscal burden on the propertied classes of Athens, a burden that continued to multiply as the war dragged on. The early costs to maintain the military had grown exponentially when the Athenians were countered by a Peloponnesian navy that threatened to cut off their food supply. To address this threat the Athenians had to keep at sea as large a fleet as possible throughout the year. At the same time the public expenditure going to citizens had not been decreased, but raised. Additionally, the loss of public revenue from tribute-paying states that rebelled, and a reduction in the collection of custom duties due to a drop in trade because of the war, put severe stress on the Athenian coffers.

The damage to the economy was intense enough to cause a reduction in the number of citizens with enough wealth to take on the fiscal burden of state, religious and military service. Before the war, the number of men fit and able to afford to be on the hoplite census or above (and therefore, be qualified to perform the accompanying liturgies) was approximately 25,000. By 411 BC (thinned by plague, war casualties and economic drain) the number was nearer to 9,000. This was a radical drop in the number of citizens available to pay the expenses of the city-state. Historian Donald Kagan calculates from ancient records that the special war taxes, religious services, and other fiscal demands legally required from the wealthy by the city state during a seven-year period (411–404 BC) was 2.5 talents. Kagan reminds us "that a talent consisted of 6,000 drachmas, that a drachma was a very good day's pay in the late fifth century, and that in those years an Athenian citizen rowing in the fleet was expected to get by on half that amount."

Among the things expected of wealthy Athenians, besides special war taxes and religious obligations, were supporting the production of comic and tragic dramas; paying for choral competitions, dancers, athletic contests, and trireme races; equipping triremes for battle in the war; serving in positions such as trierarch; and paying the eisphora; a tax on the wealth of the very rich—levied only when needed—usually in times of war.

Kagan points out that, according to ancient documents, "Nicias, one of the richest men in Athens, was expected to leave an estate of no more than 100 talents and that his son, not a notorious wastrel, left no more than 14 talents to his heir." Kagan concludes "There is good reason to think that the fortunes of many Athenian families were seriously reduced by public services during the Peloponnesian War. By 411, and especially in the years since the Sicilian disaster, the unprecedented expense would already have been strongly felt, and it would not take much imagination for the propertied classes to see that there would be similar and even greater demands in the future."

Despite the payments forced on the nobles, the fiscal situation of the Athenian empire remained in crisis. By June 411 BC, the Athenian leaders at Samos informed their troops that they could no longer expect to receive payments or funds for supplies and other expenses. The ancient historian Xenophon reports that, by that winter, the generals in the Hellespont were forced to waste time that might have otherwise been spent on training or other duties soliciting donations.

=== Leadership turnover ===
Causing further discontent was that, by 415 BC many of the respected political figures from the nobility, such as Cimon, Pericles and Nicias, had been replaced by people of lower class, such as Cleon, Hyperbolus and the noble-born but disreputable Alcibiades. Alcibiades, in 415 BC, had been accused of defaming the god Hermes and sentenced to death in absentia, a sentence causing him to flee and join the services of Sparta to escape.

With a lack of well-respected political leaders, division in Athenian society increased. By 415 BC the clubs known as hetairiai gained increasing political importance and were an outlet for those who opposed the system of democracy. With the military setback at Sicily, discontent with the city state's political institutions intensified even among the general populace.

=== Previous rumours of plots ===
The ancient historian Thucydides mentions that there was already a suspicion of a plot to overthrow the democracy before the battle of Tanagra in 457 BC and rumours of a conspiracy to replace the Athenian democracy just before the Sicilian expedition in 415 BC.

== Early involvement by Alcibiades ==
Such was the attachment to the traditional full democracy and the recognition of its general support, that despite the perceived foolishness of military and fiscal policies, incompetence in seeing them through, the vacuum of respectable leadership, the terrible fiscal burden placed upon them, and the fear of total annihilation, it was not the aristocrats of Athens who instigated the 411 BC coup. Instead, the idea was instigated from outside the city, by Alcibiades.

Alcibiades, ostensibly working for the Spartans at the time, encouraged the ideas developing among the oligarchs by claiming he could secure much needed funds for Athens from Persian satraps in western Anatolia, such as Tissaphernes (who was giving him protection) under the promise that the democracy would end. This also would open the way for Alcibiades to be allowed to return to Athens from his exile. His negotiations with the Persians already had raised suspicions among the Spartans, who worried he was concerned only with his own self-interests. He also had angered one of the two Spartan kings, Agis II, reportedly by seducing his wife.

Alcibiades sent communications to the important Athenian generals, trierarchs and others with influence, asking them to mention him to "the best people." They were to note his influence on Tissaphernes and state that he wanted to return, but only if the base and unfair democratic system that had ruled against him was replaced with an oligarchy. He then would return to Athens bringing the support of Tissaphernes with him.

The Athenians did not know that Alcibiades' relationship with Tissaphernes was precarious, for each man was pursuing his own interests, and it was only a matter of time before their association was abandoned.

== Events on Samos ==
The ancient historian Thucydides notes that the ploy by Alcibiades worked, "for the Athenian soldiers at Samos perceived that he had influence with Tissaphernes," and sent envoys from their camp to speak to him.

Thucydides does not place all the blame on Alcibiades, maintaining that the coup eventually would have gone ahead without his ploy – "But even more than the influence and promises of Alcibiades, of their own accord, the trierarchs and the most important men among the Athenians at Samos were eager to destroy the democracy."

=== Samian delegation ===
Historian Donald Kagan notes that the response at Samos to Alcibiades was split. Some wanted to side with him as a means to bring about oligarchy, others, such as the trierarch Thrasybulus, abhorred oligarchy, but felt that Alcibiades should be allowed to return in order to serve Athens, even if that meant making adjustments to the government of Athens that would make it less broadly democratic.

A delegation was sent out to speak to Alcibiades and to gather more information. Included in the delegation was Thrasybulus, who was willing to make moderate changes to the Athenian system to secure aid from some Persian sources. Also in the delegation was Peisander, who had never favored oligarchy previously, both having a reputation as a demagogue and playing a large part in the prosecutions of the scandals of 415 BC.

Another of those who had heard about Alcibiades' offer was Phrynichus, although there is no evidence that he was in the delegation that went to speak with the renegade. Phrynichus also was seen as a demagogue with no inclination toward oligarchy. He had made such a successful career as a democratic politician that he was voted into the position of general.

According to the ancient historian Thucydides, Alcibiades promised the delegation that not only could he deliver the support of Tissaphernes, but also that of the Great King of Persia "if they did not retain the democracy, for in that way the King would have greater trust in them." Alcibiades apparently judged the more moderate mood of his guests and substituted the demand for an oligarchy with a request that the pure direct democracy in Athens no longer be retained.

Returning to Samos, the delegation and other notables, plus men from the ranks of hoplites stationed at Samos (who were among the thousands sent on the Milesian campaign), joined in a xynomosia (conspiracy) taking an oath and speaking on the proposal of Alcibiades. The delegation relayed what they had learned and decided to announce Alcibiades' proposal to all the military forces stationed at Samos. According to Thucydides, they were brought together "and openly told the many that the King would be their friend and provide them with money if they took back Alcibiades and were not governed by a democracy. ... The mob, ... even if it was somewhat annoyed at the moment by what had been done, subsided into silence because of the hopeful prospect of pay from the King." Historian Donald Kagan holds that it is unlikely that they were motivated purely by greed for the Persian King's money, writing, "The salvation of their city was at issue, perhaps their own lives and those of their families, for they could not be sure that a victorious and vengeful enemy would not treat Athens as the Athenians had treated Scione and Melos." By agreeing, however, "they could obtain the financial support that would allow them to carry on the war and win it."

=== Phrynichus' protest ===
After addressing the military, the notables leading the movement gathered to decide whether Alcibiades' proposal should be accepted. Everyone approved of the idea except for Phrynichus, who completely opposed it.

Phrynichus maintained that the Great King could not be convinced to side with the Athenians, as his interests opposed theirs. Since the Athenians no longer had a naval monopoly in the Aegean and had lost large cities to the Peloponnesians, there was no reason for the Persians to try to use money in order to garner good relations. There was a long history of animosity and open warfare between Athens and the Persians, with no such lingering memories between Persia and the Peloponnesians.

In rebuttal, another notable held that perhaps if Athens replaced democracy with oligarchy, those cities that had rebelled against it would return, as many of them had adopted oligarchies. It was asserted further that this change would prevent other cities from moving into rebellion as well. Phrynichus rejected this reasoning, holding that none of that would come true, for none of the cities "will want to be enslaved with either an oligarchy or a democracy rather than to be free under whichever of these happens to exist [locally]." In addition such cities would see themselves as better off under the rule of a democratic power, as the upper classes profit most from empire and are less worried about following due process.

Phrynichus' main argument was that Alcibiades could not be trusted, because he did not care about any form of government. He only wanted a change in the Athenian constitution so he then could get his partisans in Athens to demand he be allowed to return. Phrynichus felt that should he return, this would cause violent civil unrest, which was the last thing they needed in the current circumstances. Phrynichus' advice was to continue on their current path and reject the overtures of the dangerous enemy, Alcibiades.

With the current state of crisis, Phrynichus' proposal to stay the course was rejected, and the group decided to accept Alcibiades' offer. They appointed an embassy under Peisander to go to Athens and to end the current democratic system to allow the return of Alcibiades and win over the support of Tissaphernes.

After the meeting, Phrynichus sent a letter to an enemy, Spartan admiral Astyochus, informing him of the plan and of Alcibiades' role. He excused his own betrayal of Athens, saying for a man "it was pardonable to plot evil against a man who was his enemy even to the disadvantage of the state".

=== Uprising at Samos ===
According to Thucydides, in 412 BC when the Samian people heard of the plot against the democracy, they went to some of their leaders, including Thrasybulus, "who seemed always to be especially opposed to the conspirators." Thrasybulus and his companions then rallied the Athenian sailors to defend the Samian democracy. The conspirators were overwhelmed and the democratic factions made all of the soldiers swear loyalty to the democracy, particularly those who had been involved with the oligarchs. Newly sworn, the democratic army deposed its generals and elected new ones who were reliably democratic. Thrasybulus was one of these newly elected generals.

Historian Donald Kagan holds that Thrasybulus and his supporters were not willing to abolish democracy completely, but were willing to curtail its powers temporarily in order to deal with the immediate emergency of possible annihilation by enemies of Athens. Therefore, when they went to meet with Alcibiades, he "no longer used the offensive word oligarchy but promised to return and perform his wonders 'if the Athenians were not under a democracy.' The subtle shift in language was probably real and a concession to men [such as] Thrasybulus who were prepared to alter the constitution but not to move to oligarchy."

Despite knowing Alcibiades' conditions for his return, Thrasybulus persuaded the Athenian forces at Samos to vote to grant him immunity, recall him to duty, and elect him general. He then sailed across to Tissaphernes and brought Alcibiades back to Samos. The ancient historian Thucydides records, "He brought Alcibiades back to Samos thinking that the only safety for Athens was if he could bring Tissaphernes [and the Persian fiscal support] away from the Peloponnesians and over to their side."

== Role of the probouloi ==
When news of the military defeat at Sicily reached Athens, the populace was sure that the Sicilians would press their advantage and send an invasion fleet to Attica. Not only did a successful conclusion to the war seem remote to the Athenians, but the total annihilation of their city-state seemed possible. To offset these dreadful worries, action and determination were called for.

In light of this perceived emergency, a board of elders was elected in 413 BC to secure funds and lumber (for ships and defences) and take measures to end the economic slump. These elders also would act as preliminary advisers (probouloi) whenever the situation seemed to demand it. They were seen as prudent men countering the panic of the general populace within the democracy.

Judging from the comic play Lysistrata by Aristophanes, these probouloi, in their role as preliminary councillors, took over many of the prerogatives that used to be the realm of the council. This included ensuring order, arranging ambassadors, and allocating funds for the navy. in his work Politics, Aristotle discusses the implications to a democracy concerning the use of such probouloi.

The orator Lysias recorded that Theramenes was a leader involved in the adoption of an oligarchy, and his father, who was one of the probouloi, "was active in this business". Aristotle, in a discussion in his Rhetoric, recalls that one of the probouloi, the tragedian Sophocles, admitted approving of setting up the 400, saying that although it appeared like a bad thing to do, "there was nothing better to be done."

Those favouring oligarchy persuaded the assembly to allow commissioners to rewrite the Athenian constitution. According to the historian Thucydides, there were ten of these commissioners, while Aristotle puts the number at 20 and specifies that these commissioners were in addition to the ten probouloi.

The new constitution replaced the previous council with one consisting of 400 men who would not be paid by stipend (thus barring the lower classes). Five men would be chosen for the role of "presidents", and together they would choose 100 men for the council, each of these, in turn, would choose three others, producing a total of 400. It was claimed that this organization was "according to the ancestral constitution". The 400 would have the power to choose 5,000 Athenians who would be the only citizens eligible to partake in assemblies.

== Coup ==
The oligarchs plotted two coups: one at Athens, and one at Samos, where the Athenian navy was based.

The coup at Athens went forward as planned, and "[o]n the fourteenth day of the Attic month of Thargelion, June 9, 411, ... the [conspirators] seized the reality of power." The city came under the control of the oligarchic government of the Four Hundred. According to W. G. Forrest:

[N]o one knows how many men took a positive part in promoting it (my guess would be nearer fifty than four hundred), mainly because I do not wish to limit responsibility to those who had official recognition under the new regime.

Unlike in Athens, the plotters in Samos were thwarted by Samian democratic and pro-democratic leaders in the Athenian fleet. The men of the fleet, upon learning of the coup at home, deposed their generals and elected new ones in their place. They announced that the city had revolted from them, not they from the city. The new leaders of the fleet arranged the recall of Alcibiades to Samos, and declared their intention to carry on the war against Sparta.

== Internal division and fall ==
The government of the Four Hundred in Athens suffered from instability, as conflict soon arose between moderates and extremists among the oligarchs. The moderates, led by Theramenes and Aristocrates, called for the replacement of the Four Hundred with a broader oligarchy of "the 5,000", which would include all citizens of zeugitai status or higher. Under pressure, the extremist leaders opened peace negotiations with Sparta and began constructing a fortification in the harbor of Piraeus, which the moderates believed they planned to use to give Spartan armies access to Athens. After Phrynichus was assassinated, the moderates grew bolder and arrested an extremist general in Piraeus. A confrontation ensued, which ended with the hoplites in Piraeus tearing down the new fortification. Several days later, the Four Hundred were replaced officially by the 5,000, who ruled for several more months, until after the Athenian victory at Cyzicus.

== Bibliography ==
- Buck, Robert J. (1998). Thrasybulus and the Athenian Democracy: the life of an Athenian statesman. Franz Steiner Verlag. ISBN 3-515-07221-7.
- Fine, John V.A. (1983). The Ancient Greeks: A critical history. Harvard University Press. ISBN 0-674-03314-0.
- Kagan, Donald (1991). The Fall of the Athenian Empire. Cornell University Press. ISBN 0-8014-9984-4.
- Kagan, Donald (2003). The Peloponnesian War. Penguin Books. ISBN 0-670-03211-5.
- Thucydides, History of the Peloponnesian War (Original text, translated into English).
