= Battle of Cyzicus =

Land and sea battle between Athens and Sparta in 410 BC

- Part of the Peloponnesian War
Date	410 BC
Location	Near Cyzicus, Hellespont, modern Turkey 40°23′N 27°53′E
Result	Athenian victory
Territorial changes	Cyzicus and other cities in the region captured by Athens

Belligerents
Athens	Sparta; Achaemenid Empire

Commanders and leaders
Alcibiades; Thrasybulus; Theramenes; Chaereas	Mindarus †; Hippocrates; Clearchus; Hermocrates; Pharnabazus

Strength
86 triremes	60–80 triremes

Casualties and losses
Minimal	Entire fleet
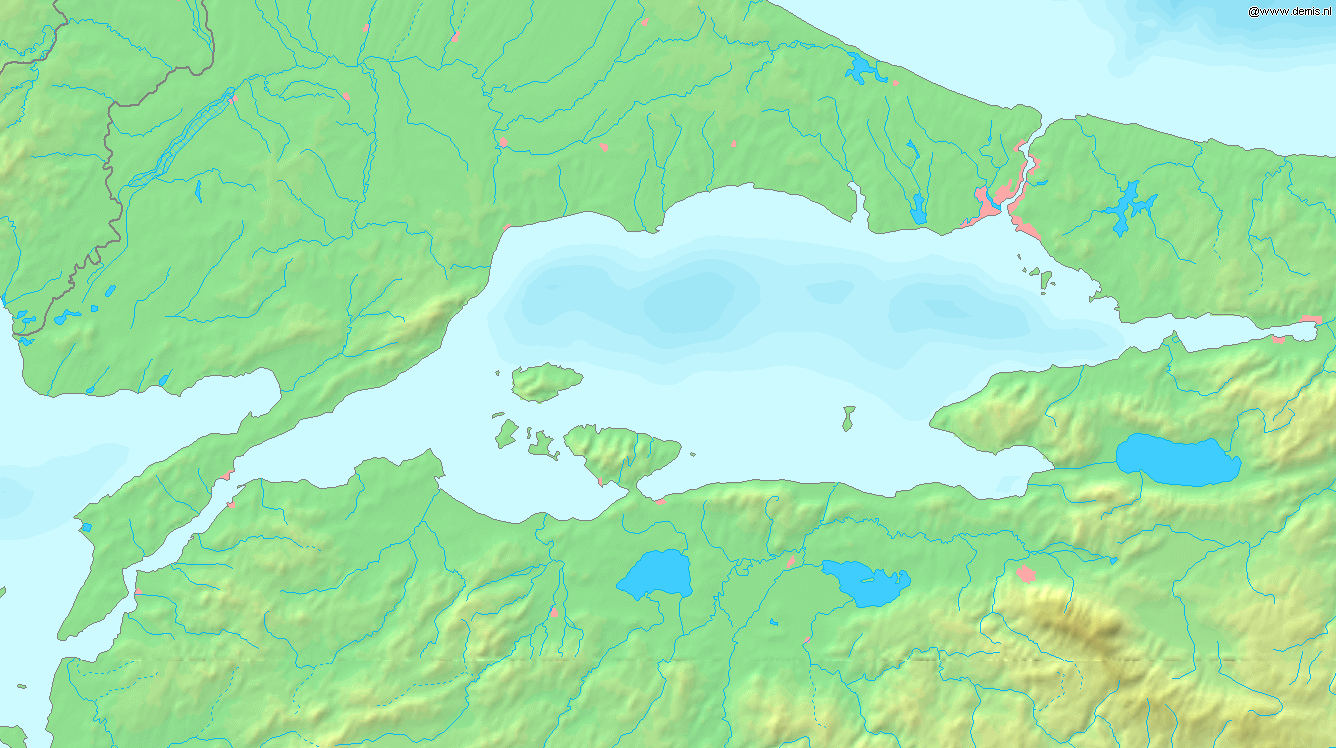
- Location within Sea of Marmara

The Battle of Cyzicus (Greek: Kyzikos) took place in May or June 410 BC during the Peloponnesian War. During the battle, an Athenian fleet commanded by Alcibiades, Thrasybulus, and Theramenes routed and destroyed a Spartan fleet commanded by Mindarus. The victory allowed Athens to recover control over a number of cities in the Hellespont over the next year. In the wake of their defeat, the Spartans made a peace offer, which the Athenians rejected.

== Prelude ==
Athens had been debilitated after the Sicilian expedition and its hold on the Hellespont had loosened with Persian support now behind Sparta. Cyzicus revolted from Athens in the summer of 411, but was recovered by the Athenian fleet after the Battle of Cynossema.

In the wake of the Athenian victory at Abydos in November 411 BC, the Spartan admiral Mindarus sent to Sparta for reinforcements and began working with the Persian satrap Pharnabazus to plan for a new offensive. The Athenians, meanwhile, were unable to follow through on their victory, since the depletion of the Athenian treasury precluded any major operations. Thus, by the spring of 410 BC, Mindarus had built a fleet of at least 60 ships, and with the support of Pharnabazus's troops, took the city of Cyzicus. The Athenian fleet in the Hellespont withdrew from its base at Sestos to Cardia to avoid the superior Spartan force, and to regroup under Alcibiades, Theramenes and Thrasybulus. The consolidated Athenian fleet, including a force of land troops under Chaereas, set out to the Hellespont to challenge Mindarus.

== Command structure and strength of the opposing forces ==
Pharnabazus controlled large Persian land forces in his satrapy, including an important cavalry force. Mindarus commanded the Peloponnesian fleet. Diodoros says that Mindarus had collected triremes from the Peloponnese and elsewhere (there were forces from as far away as Syracuse on Sicily), raising at least 80 ships, but Xenophon (the source writing closer to the time) says he had 60 ships. In any case, the Peloponnesians were not as proficient in naval warfare as their Athenian adversaries.

Alcibiades, as the senior general, was in command of the united Athenian fleet, Theramenes and Thrasybulus acting as his juniors. Alcibiades was supported by the democrats, having been elected by the Athenian fleet on Samos. Theramenes had been appointed by the oligarchic ‘5,000’ in Athens. Donald Kagan disputes Alcibiades's supreme command stating that Thrasybulus, as commander of the whole fleet and victor of Cynossema and Abydos, probably had the strategic command at Cyzicus while Alcibiades was only in command of his own squadron. As Cornelius Nepos states: "In the Peloponnesian War Thrasybulus accomplished many victories without Alcibiades; the latter accomplished nothing without the former, yet he, by some gift of nature gained all the credit." Nevertheless, the generals were, at this stage, cooperating closely. The Peloponnesians were unaware of the consolidation of the Athenian fleets and the increase in their number. The Athenian fleet is estimated to have been 86 triremes.

== Battle ==
The Athenian force entered the Hellespont, and, passing the Spartan base at Abydos by night so as to conceal their numbers, established a base on the island of Proconnesus (modern-day Marmara), just northwest of Cyzicus. The next day, they disembarked Chaereas's force near Cyzicus. The Athenian fleet then divided, with 20 ships under Alcibiades advancing towards Cyzicus while the main Athenian fleet under Thrasybulus and Theramenes lurked behind. Mindarus, seeing an opportunity to attack what appeared to be a vastly inferior force, set out towards them with his entire force. Alcibiades's force fled, and Mindarus's ships gave chase. When both forces had gotten well out from the harbor, however, Alcibiades turned to face Mindarus, and Thrasybulus and Theramenes appeared with their forces to cut off his retreat. Mindarus, seeing the trap, fled in the one open direction, towards a beach south of the city, where Pharnabazus was located with his troops. The Spartan fleet suffered losses in the flight, and reached the shore with the Athenians right behind them.

Athenian naval strategy at the battle of Cyzicus: Alcibiades' decoy force draws the Spartan fleet out into open water, and then turns about to engage them. Squadrons commanded by Thrasybulus and Theramenes move in behind the Spartan ships, to cut off their line of retreat, trapping the Spartans between three groups of Athenian warships, a much larger force than they had initially expected to engage.

Alcibiades's troops, leading the Athenian pursuit, landed and attempted to pull the Spartan ships back out to sea with grappling hooks. Pharnabazus sent his Persian soldiers to intervene; numerically superior and on firmer ground, they began to drive the Athenians into the sea. Seeing this, Thrasybulus landed his force as a diversion and ordered Theramenes to combine his troops with those of Chaereas and join the battle. For a time, Thrasybulus and Alcibiades were both driven back by superior forces, but the arrival of Theramenes and Chaereas turned the tide; the Spartans and Persians were defeated, and Mindarus was killed. All the Spartan ships were captured save for those of the Syracusan allies, who burned their ships as they retreated. (Xen. Hell. 1.1.18)

== Aftermath ==
In the wake of this dramatic victory, the Athenians had full control of the waters of the Hellespont. The next day, they took Cyzicus, which surrendered without a fight. An intercepted letter from the Spartan troops stranded near Cyzicus reads “The ships are gone. Mindarus is dead. The men are starving. We know not what to do." Demoralized by the devastation of their fleet, the Spartans sent an embassy to Athens seeking to make peace; the Athenians rejected it.

At Athens, the oligarchic government that had ruled since 411 gave way to a restored democracy within a few months of the battle. An expeditionary force under Thrasyllus was prepared to join the forces in the Hellespont. This force, however, did not depart until over a year after the battle, and although the Athenians eventually recaptured Byzantium and resumed collecting tribute from Chalcedon, they never truly pressed the advantage that Cyzicus had given them. Largely, this was a result of financial inability; even after the victory, the Athenian treasury was hard pressed to support large-scale offensive operations. Meanwhile, the Spartans, with Persian funding, quickly rebuilt their fleet, and would go on to undermine the Athenian advantage. Athens would win only one more naval battle in the war, at Arginusae, and their defeat at Aegospotami in 405 BC would bring the war to a close. Although Cyzicus was a dramatic victory for the Athenians, the Spartans were eventually able to recover their strength and end the war in their favour, with the surrender of Athens and its allies 6 years later.

== Sources ==
- Diodorus Siculus, Library
- Kagan, Donald. The Peloponnesian War (Penguin Books, 2003) ISBN 0-670-03211-5
- Xenophon (1890s) [original 4th century BC]. Hellenica . Translated by Henry Graham Dakyns – via Wikisource.
