= 403 (disambiguation) =

403 may refer to:

- 403 (year)
- 403 (number)
- 403 BC
- Area code 403
- 403 Cyane
- Peugeot 403
- Bristol 403
- IBM 403
- HTTP 403

== See also ==
- 403rd (disambiguation)
