= Thrasyllus =

Athenian general and statesman (died 406 BC)

Thrasyllus (/θrəˈsɪləs/; Ancient Greek: Θράσυλλος; died 406 BC) was an Athenian strategos (general) and statesman who rose to prominence in the later years of the Peloponnesian War. First appearing in Athenian politics in 410 BC, in the wake of the Athenian coup of 411 BC, he played a role in organizing democratic resistance in an Athenian fleet at Samos. There, he was elected strategos by the sailors and soldiers of the fleet, and held the position until he was controversially executed several years later after the Battle of Arginusae.

== After the coup ==
Thrasyllus was only a hoplite (heavy infantryman) in the ranks in 410 BC, when Athenian oligarchic revolutionaries conspired with their counterparts at Samos in a coup at both locations, but was one of four Athenians (the others were Thrasybulus, Leon, and Diomedon) who the Samian democrats trusted for protection from the plot. These leaders were able to thwart the coup at Samos, but the coup at Athens was successful, leaving the democratically controlled fleet in opposition to its oligarchically controlled mother city. In the turmoil following these events, the generals at Samos were deposed by the soldiers and sailors of the fleet, and Thrasybulus and Thrasyllus were among those elected to replace them.

Thrasyllus continued to hold the position of strategos for several years, over a number of campaigns. Later in 410 BC, he led an Athenian fleet to attack rebellious cities on Lesbos. However, in doing so, he allowed Spartan Admiral Mindarus to slip past him into the Hellespont with the Spartan fleet in what historian Donald Kagan considers to be an error in strategic judgement. Thrasyllus pursued Mindarus with his fleet, and combined with other Athenian detachments at Sestos. From there, the Athenians (with Thrasybulus now in overall command) sailed into the Hellespont and defeated Mindarus's fleet at Cynossema, putting an end to the immediate crisis. Thrasyllus commanded a wing of the fleet in this battle and the later Athenian victory at Abydos, but then left on other detachments; after his departure Thrasybulus, Theramenes, and Alcibiades destroyed Mindarus and his fleet at Cyzicus.

== Under the democracy ==
Later in 410 BC, Thrasyllus returned home to Athens to raise more troops for further campaigning in the Aegean and elsewhere. While he was there, the Spartan king Agis led his army toward the walls of Athens, seeking to frighten the city into capitulating. Thrasyllus marched out with an Athenian army, which, although it did not challenge the Spartans away from the protection of its own walls, did succeed in picking off a number of stragglers when the Spartans withdrew.

The next summer, Thrasyllus sailed out from Athens with a sizable force to campaign in Ionia. There, he quickly captured Colophon and raided the Ionian countryside, but was defeated outside Ephesus by a combined Ephesian, Persian, and Syracusan force, and withdrew his troops first to Notium and then later to Lampsacus, where they joined the larger Athenian force operating in the Hellespont. Kagan has again criticized Thrasyllus' capabilities as a general in this campaign, arguing that Thrasyllus wasted time plundering when more decisive action could have led to the speedy capture of Ephesus, a major strategic prize.

At Lampsacus, Thrasyllus' troops, coming straight from an embarrassing defeat, were at first rejected by the troops who had served at Cynossema and Abydos, who forced them to camp apart. The tension between the groups was eventually dissolved after the Athenians launched an attack on Abydos, in which Thrasyllus commanded thirty ships; the Athenians defeated a Persian army in battle, but could not take the city. The newly united Athenian army did, however, succeed in retaking Chalcedon, Byzantium, and other cities in the Hellespont in the summer of 408 BC; Thrasyllus commanded detachments in several operations during this period. He then returned, along with most of the fleet and its commanders, to Athens, where Alcibiades, fresh from these victories, made his triumphal return to the city that had exiled him.

== Arginusae ==
Thrasyllus did not hold a generalship in 407-6 BC, but was swept back into office in the following year, when Alcibiades and his political associates fell from power after the Athenian defeat at Notium. Thrasyllus remained home during the early part of his generalship, while Conon, another general, went out to Samos to take command of the fleet. He experienced some initial success in raiding enemy-held territory, but the tremendous financial support that the Spartans were receiving from the Persian prince Cyrus enabled them to expand their fleet until the Athenians were heavily outnumbered. Forced to sally forth from Samos with only 70 triremes to match the Spartans' 170, Conon was defeated in battle and bottled up in Mytilene, barely managing to send a trireme to Athens with the news of his predicament.

When news of this crisis reached Athens, the city found itself facing a desperate situation. To challenge the superior Peloponnesian fleet, the Athenians had only 40 ready triremes, and most of the experienced crews were at sea with Conon. To rebuild their fleet, the Athenians were forced to melt down golden religious statues from the acropolis, and the 110 ships the city possessed after this construction were crewed by a mix of less-experienced rowers, farmers, wealthy cavalrymen, and emancipated slaves. All eight generals who remained at Athens, Thrasyllus among them, sailed out with this scratch fleet; none is known to have served as supreme commander. The Athenian fleet, bolstered by 55 ships from allied cities, met a Spartan fleet of 120 ships under Callicratidas at the Arginusae islands, just south of Lesbos. In the resulting battle, the Athenians divided their fleet into 8 autonomous divisions, with Thrasyllus commanding the forward right wing; by limiting the opportunities for the Spartan crews to exercise their superior seamanship, the Athenians were able to wear their enemies down, and the day ended in a decisive Athenian victory. The remnants of the Peloponnesian fleet fled southward, leaving some 70 ships behind, and the blockading force at Mytilene, upon hearing of the result, also fled.

=== Storm, controversy, trial, and execution ===
In the wake of this remarkable victory, the eight generals met and decided that all of their number, with the larger part of the fleet, would sail against the blockading force at Mytilene, while the trierarchs Thrasybulus and Theramenes remained with 47 ships to rescue the survivors of disabled Athenian ships. Shortly after the main force had departed, however, a severe storm blew up, and the detachment assigned to rescue duty was unable to carry out its responsibility. The result, for the sailors clinging to disabled and sinking ships, was a disaster; a great number of Athenians—estimates as to the precise figure have ranged from near 1,000 to as many as 5,000—drowned.

Soon after the news of this public tragedy reached Athens, a massive controversy erupted over the apportionment of blame for the botched rescue. The public was furious that the dead from the battle had not been recovered for burial (in the religious atmosphere of ancient Greece, this failing may have been almost as serious as abandoning the survivors in the eyes of the Athenian populace); the generals suspected that Thrasybulus and Theramenes, who had already returned to Athens, might have been responsible for stirring up the assembly against them, and so Thrasyllus and his colleagues wrote letters to the people denouncing the two trierarchs as responsible for the failed rescue. The trierarchs were called before the assembly to account for their actions, but they defended themselves capably, and the generals were deposed from their offices and recalled to Athens. Two fled, but Thrasyllus and five others returned to the city. Their defense initially met with a sympathetic response, but the festival of the Apaturia, on which families were supposed to meet for celebrations, provided an opportunity for their political enemies to remind the populace of the loss it had suffered. In a vicious and emotional meeting of the assembly the next day, the assembly, following the lead of the aggressive Callixenus, tried the generals en masse and condemned them all to die. Although the Athenians soon came to regret their rash decision, it was too late for Thrasyllus and his comrades; all six were dead before the assembly had a chance to reconsider.
