= 403 BC =

403 BC in various calendars
Gregorian calendar	403 BC; CDIII BC
Ab urbe condita	351
Ancient Egypt era	XXVIII dynasty, 2
Pharaoh	Amyrtaeus, 2
Ancient Greek Olympiad (summer)	94th Olympiad, year 2
Assyrian calendar	4348
Balinese saka calendar	N/A
Bengali calendar	−996 – −995
Berber calendar	548
Buddhist calendar	142
Burmese calendar	−1040
Byzantine calendar	5106–5107
Chinese calendar	丁丑年 (Fire Ox); 2295 or 2088 — to — 戊寅年 (Earth Tiger); 2296 or 2089
Coptic calendar	−686 – −685
Discordian calendar	764
Ethiopian calendar	−410 – −409
Hebrew calendar	3358–3359
- Hindu calendars
Vikram Samvat	−346 – −345
Shaka Samvat	N/A
Kali Yuga	2698–2699
Holocene calendar	9598
Iranian calendar	1024 BP – 1023 BP
Islamic calendar	1055 BH – 1054 BH
Javanese calendar	N/A
Julian calendar	N/A
Korean calendar	1931
Minguo calendar	2314 before ROC 民前2314年
Nanakshahi calendar	−1870
Thai solar calendar	140–141
Tibetan calendar	阴火牛年 (female Fire-Ox) −276 or −657 or −1429 — to — 阳土虎年 (male Earth-Tiger) −275 or −656 or −1428

Year 403 BC was a year of the pre-Julian Roman calendar. At the time, it was known as the Year of the Tribunate of Mamercinus, Varus, Potitus, Iullus, Crassus and Fusus (or, less frequently, year 351 Ab urbe condita). The denomination 403 BC for this year has been used since the early medieval period, when the Anno Domini calendar era became the prevalent method in Europe for naming years.

== Events ==
=== By place ===
==== Greece ====
- Thrasybulus leads the democratic resistance to the new oligarchic government, known as the Thirty Tyrants, that the victorious Spartans have imposed on Athens. He commands a small force of exiles that invades Attica and, in successive battles, defeats first a Spartan garrison and then the forces of the oligarchic government (which includes the Spartan general, Lysander) in the Battle of Munychia. The leader of the Thirty Tyrants, Critias, is killed in the battle.
- The Battle of Piraeus is fought between Athenian exiles, who have defeated the government of the Thirty Tyrants and occupied Piraeus, and a Spartan force sent to combat them. In the battle, the Spartans narrowly defeat the exiles, with both sides suffering large numbers of casualties. After the battle, the Agiad King of Sparta, Pausanias arranges a settlement between the two parties which allows the reunification of Athens and Piraeus, and the re-establishment of democratic government in Athens. The remaining oligarchic Thirty Tyrants are allowed to flee to Eleusis.
- Thrasybulus restores democratic institutions to Athens and grants amnesties to all except the oligarchic extremists. He is helped by Lysias, the Athenian orator, in arguing the case against the oligarchy.
- Andocides, Athenian orator and politician, who has been implicated in the mutilation of the Herms on the eve of the departure of the Athenian expedition against Sicily in 415 BC, returns from exile under the general amnesty.

==== China ====
- The states of Han, Zhao and Wei receive official recognition as Marquesses from the Eastern Zhou dynasty, confirming the Partition of Jin. This is one of the traditional starting points of the Warring States period.
- Marquis Wen of Wei ascends to power in Wei. He sponsors Confucianism and employs able political advisors such as Li Kui, Wu Qi, and Ximen Bao.
- Marquis Lie of Zhao becomes the ruler of the state of Zhao.
- Marquis Jing of Han ascends to power in Han.

==== Rome ====
- Rome elects eight military tribunes with consular power; Manlius Aemilius Mamercus, Lucius Valerius Potitus, Appius Claudius Crassus, Marcus Quinctilius Varus, Lucius Julius Julus, Marcus Postumius, Marcus Furius Camillus, and Marcus Postumius

=== By topic ===
==== Literature ====
- Under archon Eucleides, the Athenians accept a spelling reform, adopting the Ionian alphabet, which includes eta and omega. The new alphabet came to be known as the Euclidean alphabet.

== Deaths ==
- Critias, leading member of the Athenian Thirty Tyrants oligarchy (b. 460 BC)
