= 403rd Division =

403rd Division may refer to:

- 403rd Security Division, Wehrmacht, Germany
- 403rd Rifle Division, Soviet Union

== See also ==
- List of military divisions by number
- 403rd (disambiguation)
