= Harpagia Sulcus =

Bright region on Ganymede

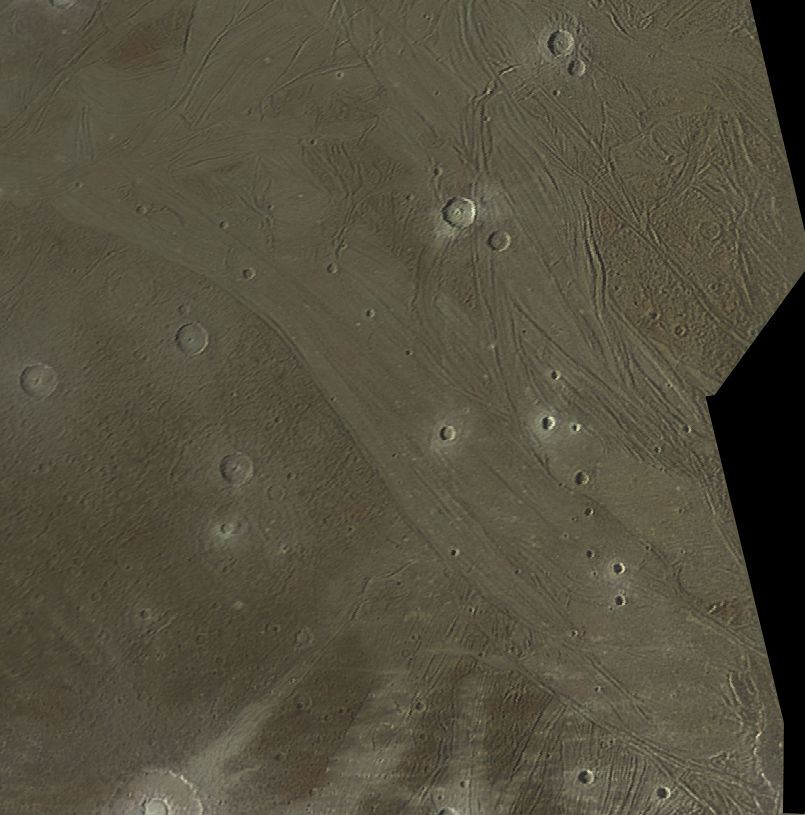
- A mosaic image of Harpagia Sulcus, created by combining images from the Voyager spacecraft and the Galileo space probe. The crater at the edge of the image at the lower left is Enkidu.
- Feature type: Sulcus
- Coordinates: 11.80°S 313.50°W
- Length: 1,400 kilometres (870 mi)
- Eponym: Ἁρπαγεῖα Harpagia

Harpagia Sulcus is a bright, grooved terrain on Jupiter's moon Ganymede. It is roughly triangular in shape and is about 1,400 kilometres (870 mi) across.

== Naming ==
Harpagia Sulcus is named after an area in modern-day Turkey that was traditionally called Harpagia by the Greeks in ancient times, before the Turkish invasion of the region during the medieval ages. According to some versions of Greek mythology, this was the place where the handsome Trojan prince Ganymede was abducted by Zeus (the Greek equivalent of the god Jupiter) in the form of an eagle. Ganymede was then taken to Mount Olympus to serve as the cupbearer of the gods.

The International Astronomical Union (IAU) chose this name in line with the theme that surface features and craters on Ganymede be named either after deities, heroes and places from Ancient Near Eastern mythologies, or figures and places related to the prince Ganymede or his home kingdom of Troy. Harpagia Sulcus belongs to the latter category because it was the place near Troy where Ganymede was snatched by Zeus. The name was approved by the IAU in 1985.

== Location ==
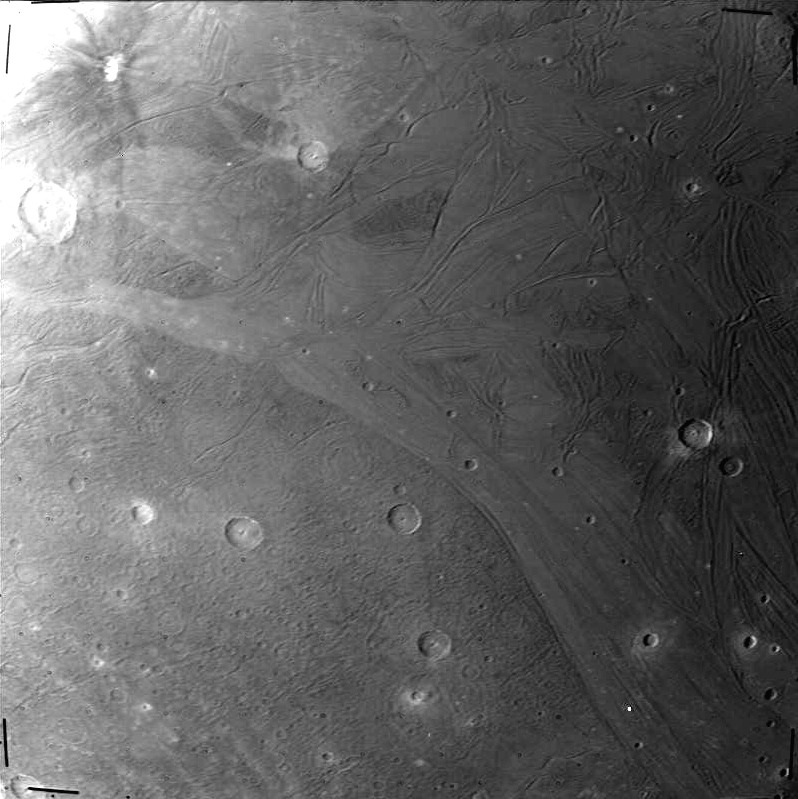
An image of the boundary between Harpagia Sulcus (upper right) and Nicholson Regio (lower left), by Voyager 1 in March 1979. To the upper left corner of the image is the crater Kittum.

Harpagia Sulcus is located between two dark regions on Ganymede: Nicholson Regio to the west and Melotte Regio to the east. The sulcus forms the eastern boundary of Nicholson Regio and it is situated a few kilometers south of Ganymede's equator.

To its northeast lie the dark ray crater Kittu and the pit crater Misharu, as well as the terminus of another bright grooved terrain called Arbela Sulcus. To the north is Mysia Sulci, while to the southwest lie the bright ray crater Enkidu and the surface depression Hammamat Patera. To the east of Harpagia Sulcus is another dark-ray crater called We-ila.

Most of Harpagia Sulcus lies within the Misharu quadrangle of Ganymede (designated Jg10); however, owing to its great length, the southern portion of the sulcus extends into the Namtar quadrangle (designated Jg14) to the south.

Due to Ganymede's synchronous rotation during its orbit around Jupiter, one hemisphere of the moon always faces its parent planet. Harpagia Sulcus is located on the hemisphere of Ganymede that permanently faces Jupiter; as a result, an observer standing on Harpagia Sulcus would always see Jupiter in the sky.

== Age and Natural History ==
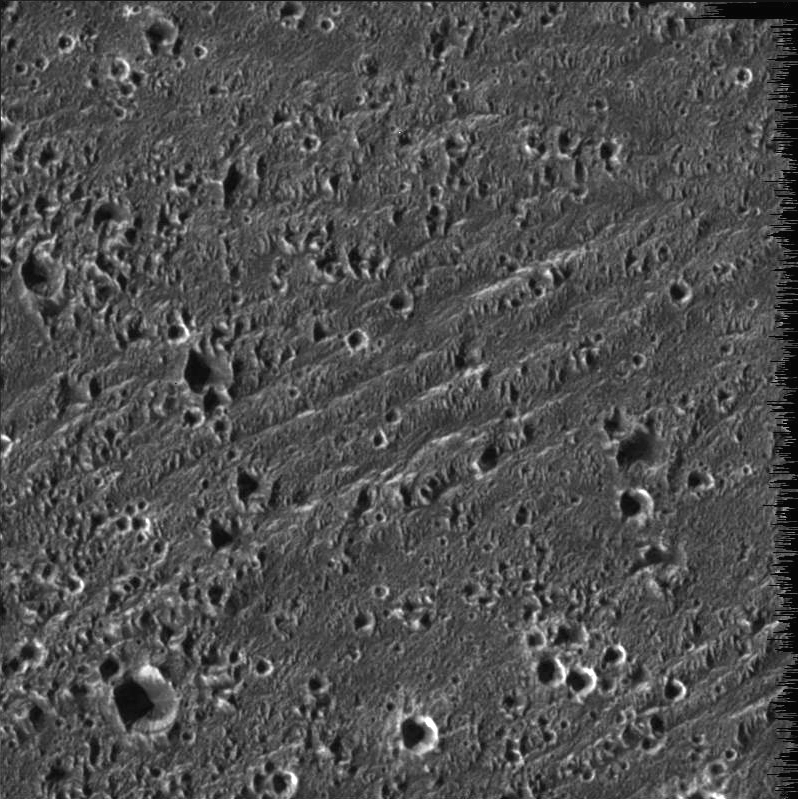
A section of Harpagia close to Nicholson Regio, imaged by Galileo in May 2000.

Harpagia Sulcus is one of Ganymede's bright terrains. Like most other bright terrains, the sulcus is believed to be among the younger surface features on Ganymede, formed when fresh, clean water ice from beneath the moon's surface wells up, effectively erasing darker, older terrains. Fresh ice is good in reflecting sunlight, making these terrains look brighter than the darker, older areas on Ganymede.

According to the United States Geological Survey, the geological history of Ganymede can be divided into three periods. The first and oldest era is the Nicholsonian Period four billion years ago, during which Ganymede's surface was darkened and heavily bombarded by meteors, forming countless impact craters. It was followed by the Harpagian Period, during which approximately two-thirds of Ganymede's surface underwent a major resurfacing event. During this period, the moon's bright, grooved terrains composed of fresher material formed, erasing much of the older, darker terrain. Many ancient craters were also erased or significantly degraded during this resurfacing. Harpagia Sulcus is believed to have formed around this time as part of the same resurfacing event and it represents the base of this stratigraphic system.

== Geology ==
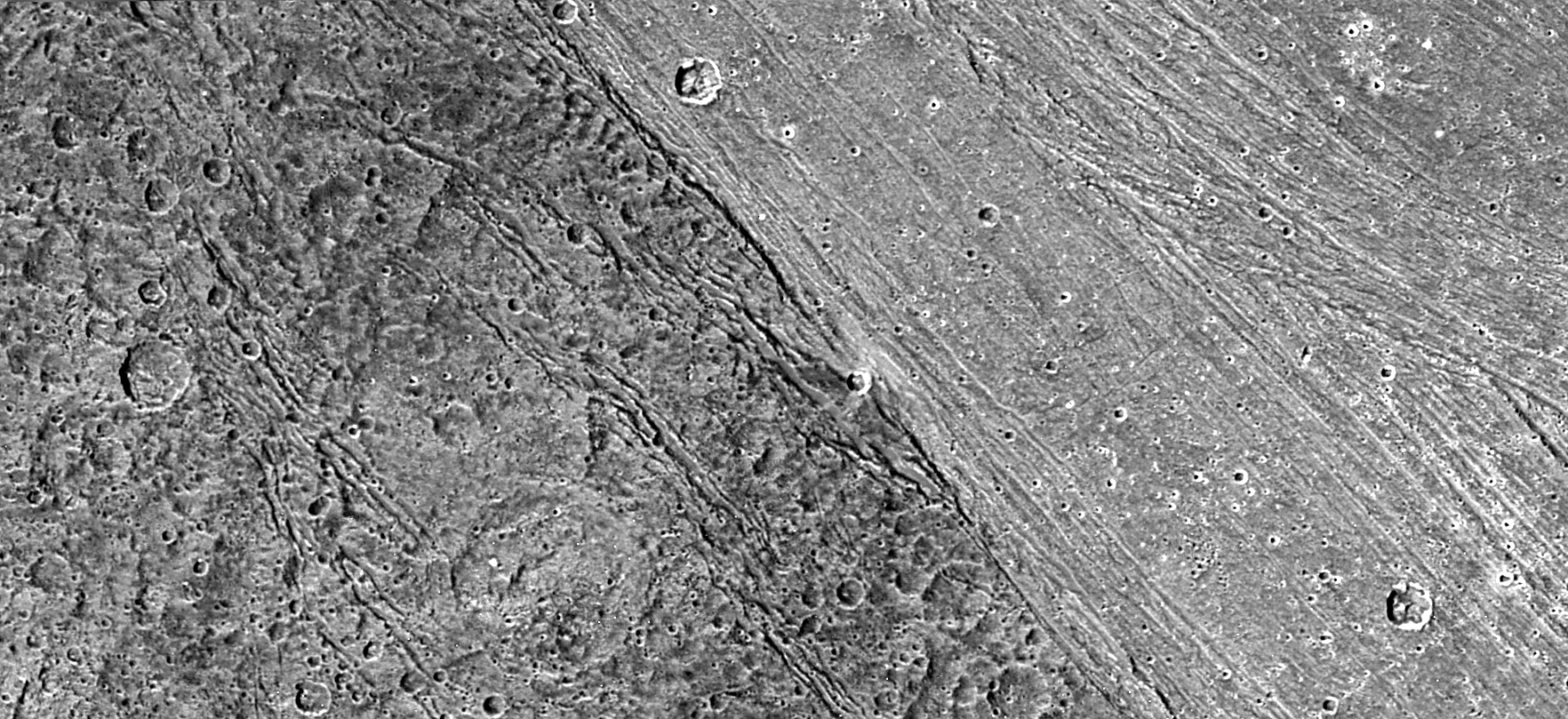
An image clearly showing the boundary and difference between the rougher, older Nicholson Regio (left) and the smoother, younger Harpagia Sulcus (right).

Owing to its younger surface, grooved terrains are also generally smoother and less saturated with craters compared to Ganymede's more rugged, older dark terrains. This process, in which older terrain is erased and overlain by newer, fresher terrain through tectonic activity, is common across Ganymede’s surface and plays a major role in shaping the moon’s appearance. In the case of Harpagia Sulcus, it overprinted and resurfaced large portions of the dark Nicholson Regio and Melotte Regio, effectively separating the two terrains.

Bright terrains on Ganymede are analogous in age to the dark lunar maria on Earth's Moon, since both represent the youngest terrains on their respective surfaces. By contrast, Ganymede's dark terrains are analogous to the Moon's bright highlands, which predate the maria. Unlike the Moon's maria, which formed from basaltic lava, Ganymede's grooved terrain is composed primarily of frozen water ice.

== Topography ==
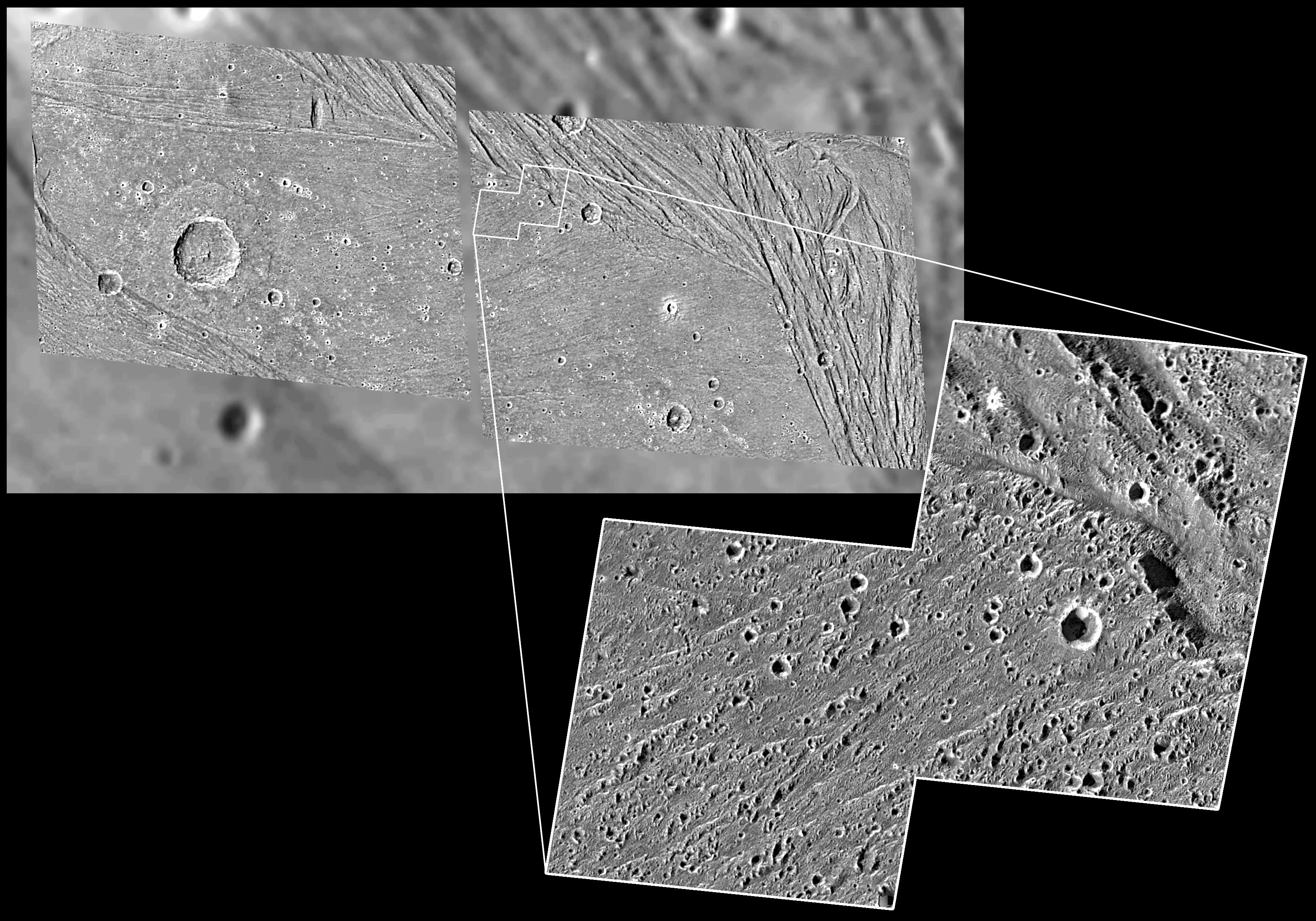
A closeup image of Harpagia Sulcus, taken by the Galileo space probe in May 2000.

Although Harpagia Sulcus is classified as a bright, smooth terrain, close-up images captured by the Galileo space probe reveal that it is not as smooth as medium-resolution images suggest. Many areas of Harpagia Sulcus are actually covered with small craters, bumps, and knobs.

At the zone where the light terrain of Harpagia Sulcus and dark terrain of Nicholson Regio meet, the maximum topographic difference between the highest point of the dark terrain and the lowest point of the bright terrain is approximately 1 kilometre (0.62 mi) and does not exceed this value.

== Exploration ==
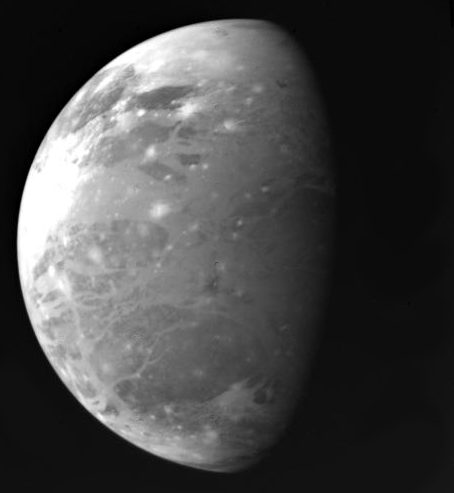
A wide-angle, greyscale image of Ganymede showing Harpagia Sulcus (lower right), taken by Voyager 1 in March 1979.

Voyager 1 became the first probe to view and photograph Harpagia Sulcus during its flyby of Ganymede in March 1979. It was able to capture both wide-angle and narrow-angle images of the sulcus. Harpagia was near the terminator of Ganymede during Voyager 1's flyby, which allowed the probe to capture high-resolution images of the sulcus. The eastern half of the sulcus, however, was on the night side of the moon and could not be photographed during the probe's quick visit.

A global image of Ganymede centered on Harpagia Sulcus, taken by the Galileo space probe in March 1998.

The Galileo became the next probe to image Harpagia Sulcus. During its flyby of Ganymede in May 2000, it was able to fly as low as 1,000 kilometres (620 mi) from the surface and obtain images with a resolution as fine as 116 metres (381 ft) per pixel. As of 2026, Galileo's images of Harpagia Sulcus are the only available close-up images of the region.

=== Future missions ===
The European Space Agency (ESA) launched a space probe called Jupiter Icy Moons Explorer (Juice) in April 2023, and it is scheduled to arrive at Jupiter in July 2031. After spending approximately three and a half years in orbit around Jupiter and performing multiple flybys of Europa, Ganymede and Callisto, Juice will settle into a low polar orbit around Ganymede at an altitude of as low as 500 kilometres (310 mi). Juice is expected to send very high resolution images of Harpagia Sulcus that will allow planetary scientists to determine the sequence of events during the Harpagian period.

== See also ==
Sulcus (geology)
