= Dorieus (Rhodian athlete and naval commander) =

5th-century BC Greek boxer and Olympic victor

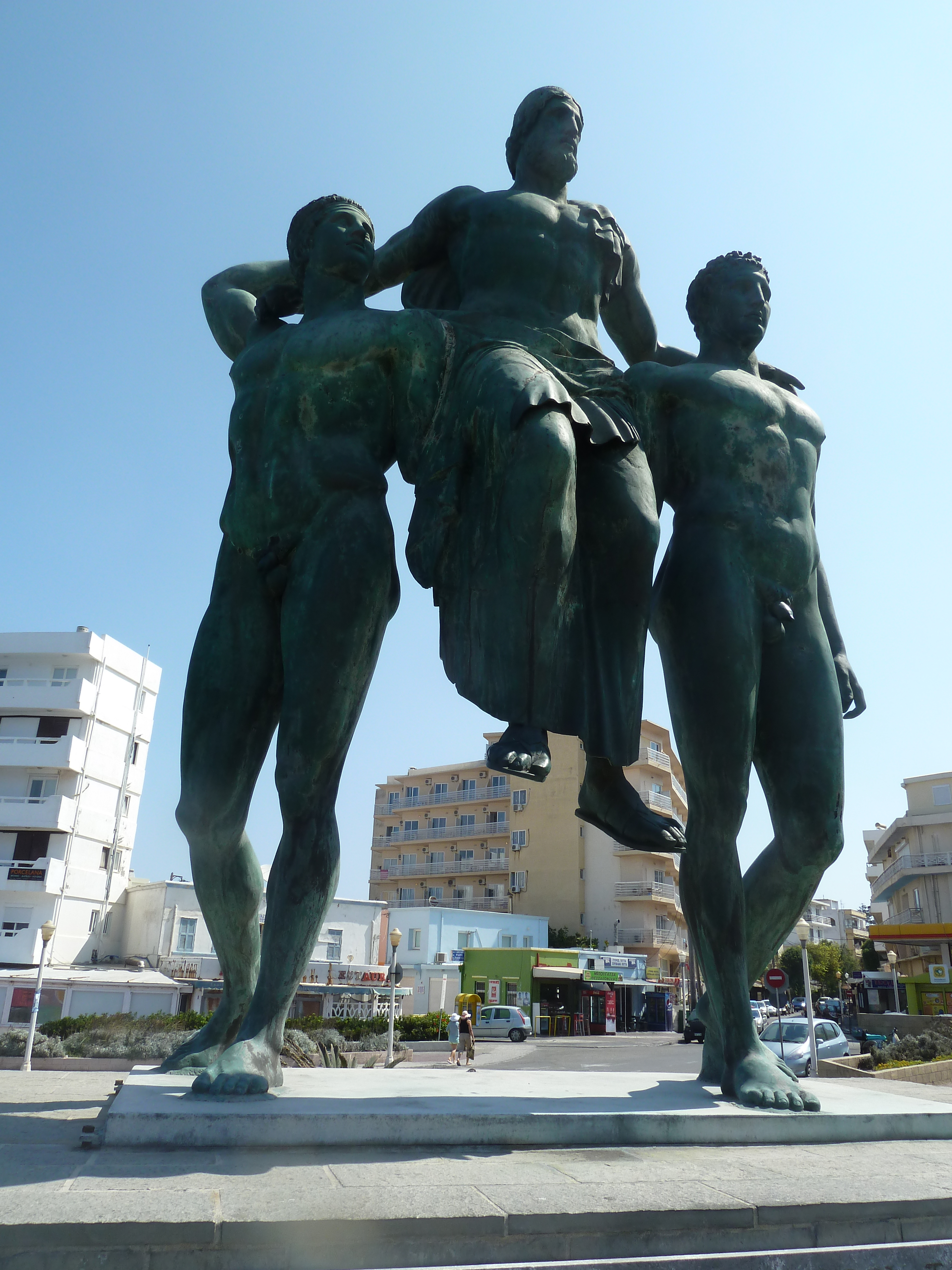
Statue of Diagoras carried by his sons Damagetos and Akousilaos (in Rhodes)

Dorieus (Gr. Δωριεύς) of Ialysos in Rhodes commanded small naval contingents supporting the Spartan fleet during the last decade of the Peloponnesian War and is attributed with a Rhodian revolt from Athens and a synoecism. He was also a renowned Olympic athlete.

== Family ==
Dorieus was the grandson of Damagetos, king of Ialysos. His father, Diagoras of Rhodes, was a celebrated boxer and Olympic victor. Diagoras won the boxing at several Panhellenic games and was honoured by Pindar. Dorieus’ elder brothers were also elite athletes. His brother Damagetos, won pankration events and his other brother, Akousilaos, won boxing victories at Panhellenic games. These two elder brothers celebrated one particular victory of their father’s by carrying Diagoras around the stadium on their shoulders. The image became a popular theme in Rhodian art. Dorieus’ sister Kallipateira was said to have been the only woman to have attended the Olympic games. When caught, she escaped execution out of respect for her family.

== Athletic victories ==
Dorieus was even more successful in athletics than these celebrated members of his family. He won the pankration at Olympia in three successive games as well as victories at eight Isthmian games, seven Nemean games and four Pythian games. Dorieus also won several victories at other festivals (not in the periodos), including the Athenian Panathenaea, the Asklepeia in Epidaurus, the Hekatombaia in Argos and the Lykaia in Arcadia. Aristotle says that Dorieus’ reputation was so great that his name even became synonymous for athletic success.

== Activity in the Peloponnesian War ==
Although Dorieus’ family usually dominated political affairs in Rhodes, their fortunes were not always secure. Dorieus seems to have been exiled and settled at Thurii in Italy some time before 424 BC. In 412 BC he led a contingent of ten ships from Thurii to support the Spartans in the Ionian War. In 411 BC he was probably active in the defection of Rhodes from Athens, as it was at this time that he was condemned to death by the Athenians in absentia. But it was not a matter of being anti-Athenian or pro-Spartan and his actions were always consistent with Rhodian interests. For example, he advocated for Rhodian troops against the Spartan general Astyochus.

Diodorus Siculus reports that, in 411, the Spartan general Mindaros despatched Doreius from Miletus to Rhodes to quell a counter-revolution there with a fleet of 14 triremes. He was successful in this mission and it is said that he brought the cities of Rhodes under one authority (a synoecism). After this, Dorieus returned to assist Mindaros in the Hellespont. Xenophon says that on arrival with his fleet of 13 ships he was attacked by an Athenian squadron and forced to flee to Rhoeteum and could not assist Mindaros in the subsequent Battle of Abydos.

In 407 BC he was captured by the Athenians. Despite the death sentence already on his head, he was released as a mark of respect for his esteemed record in panhellenic games.

== Death ==
In 397-396 Rhodian democrats revolted from Sparta, dislodged the Diagoreans from power, expelled the Spartans and admitted the Athenian general, Konon.

Only Androtion records Doreius’ death. He claimed that he had been active in the Peloponnese just after the revolt from Sparta and was executed by the Spartans in 395 BC, despite his high standing. But Pausanias questions the veracity of Androtion’s statement.
