= Diagoras of Rhodes =

5th-century BC Olympic boxer

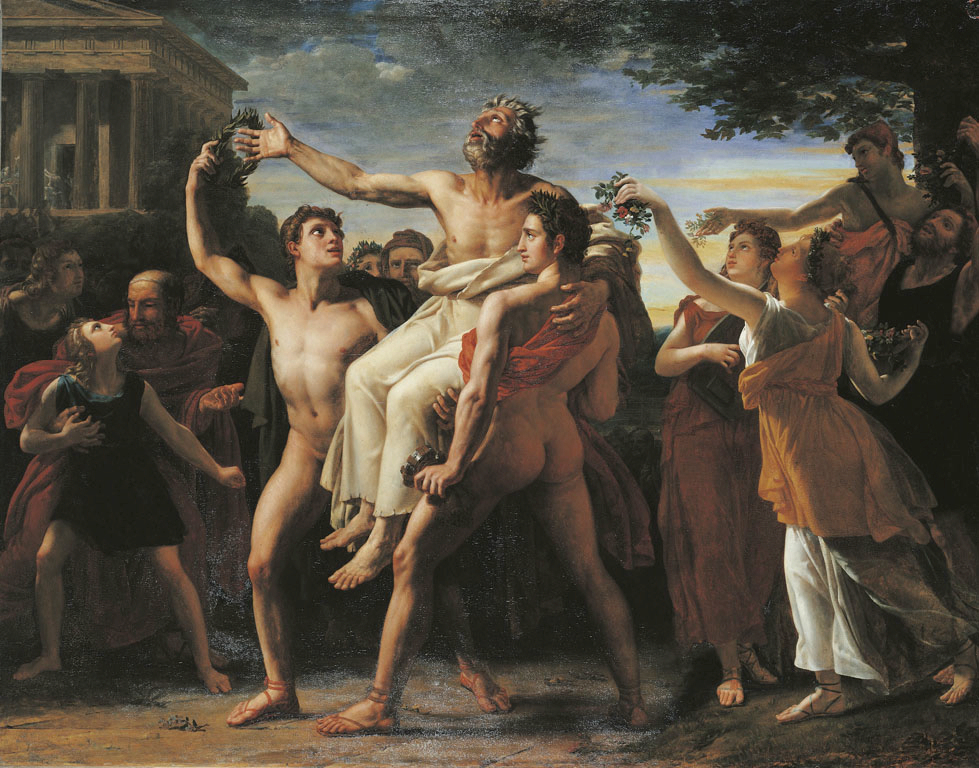
Depiction of Diagoras being carried by his two sons after an Olympic victory.

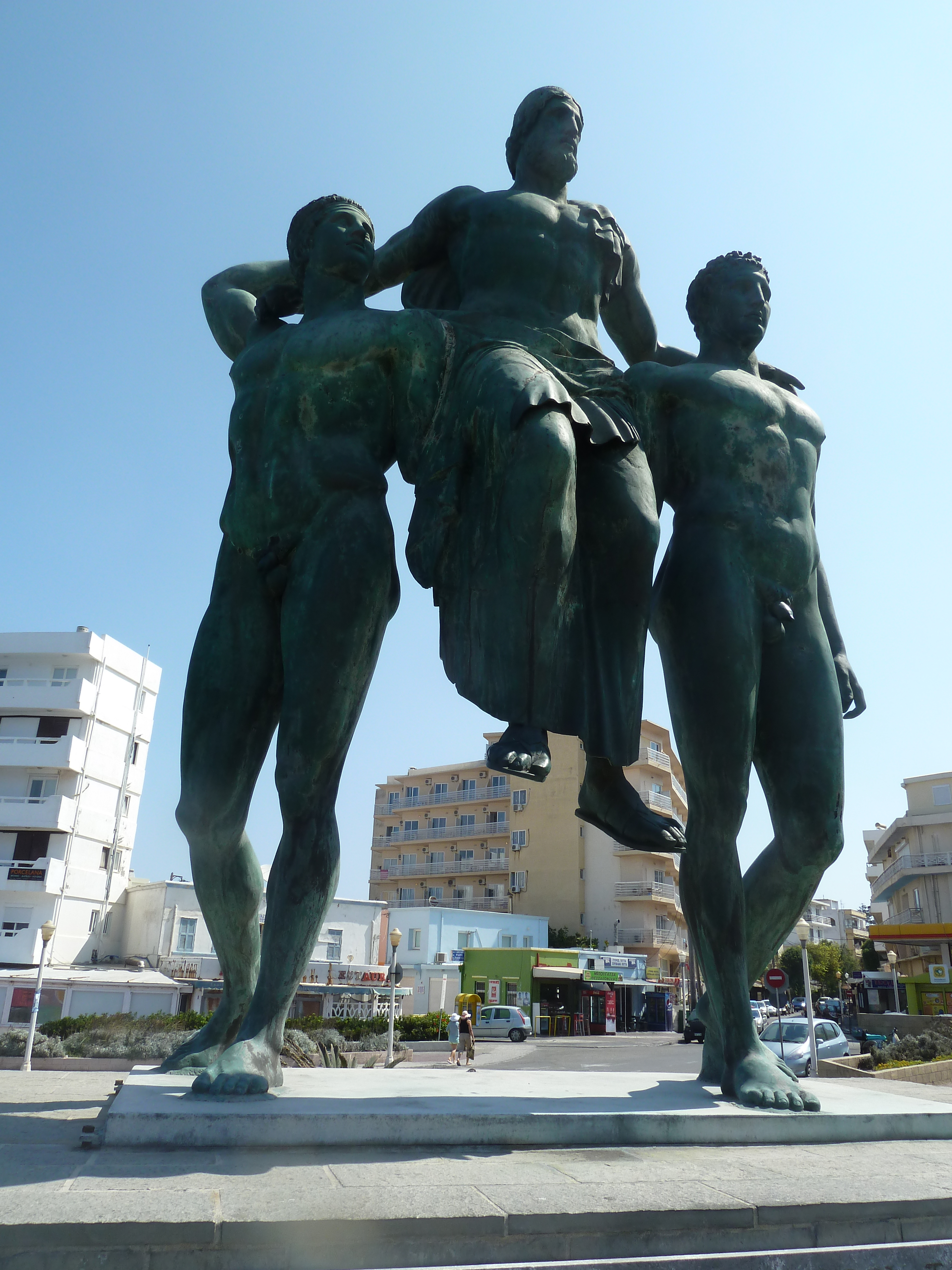
Modern statue in Rhodes city

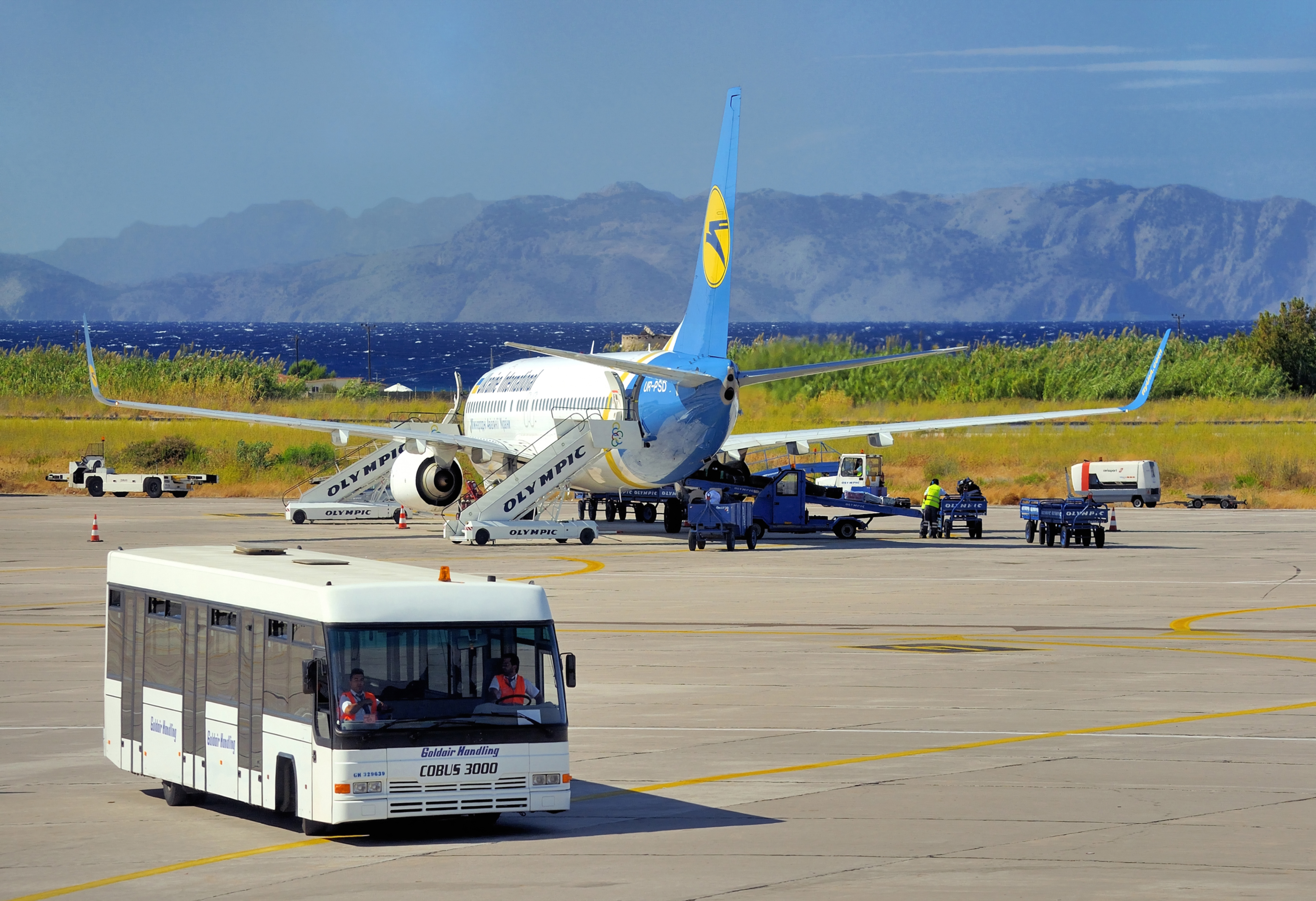
Rhodes international airport "Diagoras".

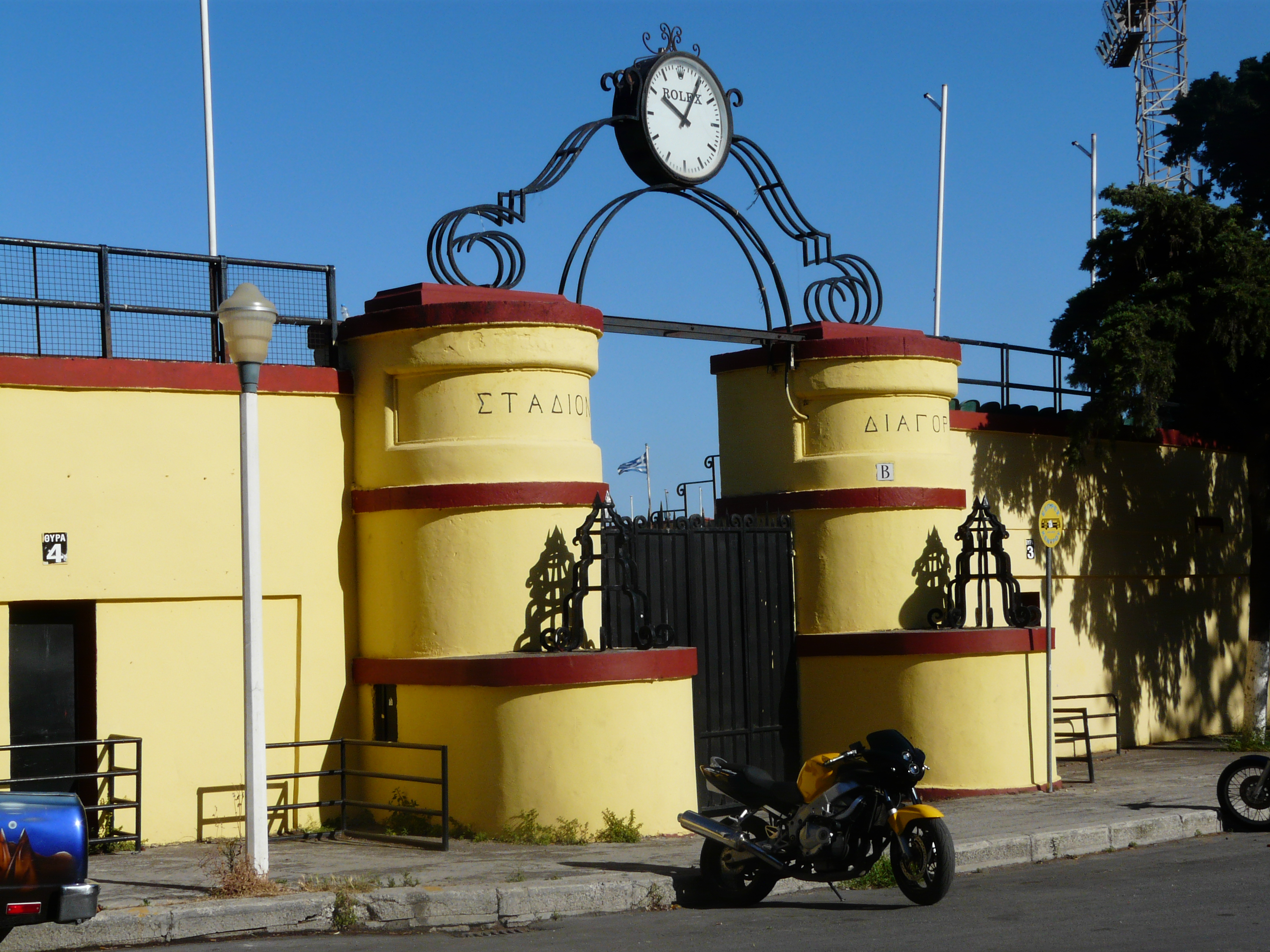
Diagoras Stadium in the city of Rhodes

Diagoras of Rhodes (/daɪəˈæɡərəs/; Ancient Greek: Διαγόρας ὁ Ῥόδιος) was an Ancient Greek boxer from the 5th century BC, who was celebrated for his own victories, as well as the victories of his sons and grandsons. He was a member of the Eratidea family at Ialysos in Rhodes.

== Biography ==
Diagoras descended from Damagetus, king of Ialysus and, on his mother's side from Messenian hero and king Aristomenes. Diagoras was victor in boxing twice in the Olympic games, four times in the Isthmian, twice in the Nemean, and once at least in the Pythian Games. The fame of Diagoras and his descendants was celebrated by Pindar (Olympian Odes VII). A local soccer club, Diagoras F.C., and the Rhodes International Airport, "Diagoras" are named after him.

His three sons were Olympic champions. The oldest son, Damagetos, won the pankration in 452 and 448 BC. Akousílaos, the second son, won the boxing in 448 BC. The two celebrated their victory by carrying their father around the stadion on their shoulders, cheered loudly by the spectators. Legend has it that during Diagoras' triumphant ovation on the shoulders of his sons, a spectator shouted: "Die, Diagoras; you will not ascend to Olympus besides"- meaning being that he has reached the highest honor possible for a man- at which point, Diagoras would immediately pass away.

His youngest son, Dorieus, was even more successful than his brothers.

According to another legend revived by Pausanias, Diagoras' daughter Kallipáteira ("she of the beautiful father") was the only lay woman to enter the Olympic Games. Excepting the priestess of Demeter, all women were banned from watching because athletes performed in the nude. Kallipateira's son Peisírrhodos as well as her nephew Euklēs had both won in the Olympic Games, when she decided to sneak into the crowd disguised as a man. She was discovered and brought before the Hellanodíkai (judges of the games) to be tried for sacrilege on pain of death; there she proclaimed that if any woman could ever be allowed to defy the ban, it was she, having had a father, three brothers, a son and a nephew achieve victory eight times. The judges were awed and she was acquitted. However according to Pausanias a law was passed that future trainers should strip before entering the arena.

Similarly, Chilon of Sparta also supposedly died of joy the day when his son gained the prize for boxing at the Olympic games.

== Fireless Sacrifices: Pindar's Olympian 7 ==
In his seventh ode, Pindar writes of the glorious Olympic victories of Diagoras. This poem carries itself in a very Diagoras like fashion, telling the mythical tale of his home island of Rhodes. This further entrenches Diagoras' legacy not just in his personal victories, but also in his homeland and with the people he wished to carry that legacy. Pindar acknowledges his numerous boxing victories in Olympian 7 writing: "Diagoras has had himself crowned twice, and at the renowned Isthmus four times, in his good fortune, and again and again at Nemea and in rocky Athens". Pindar also then incorporated greek mythology into his work in honoring Diagoras in Olympian 7 saying: "Father Zeus, you who rule over the ridges of Atabyrium, grant honor to the hymn ordained in praise of an Olympian victor, and to the man who has found excellence as a boxer, and grant to him honored grace in the eyes of both citizens and strangers. For he walks a straight course on a road that hates arrogance, knowing clearly the sound prophetic wisdom of his good ancestors.". There is a pattern of Diagoras being connected in writings such as Olympian 7 to his land and his people. This connection is modeled through his boxings victories and the mythology surrounding Rhodes, creating a vessel in which his legacy has been carried.

== Victory and fatherless ==
Diagoras of Rhodes was unique in his sporting conquests due to way he embedded his family into the legacy of his victories. The great boxer went to new lengths to make his victories in sporting and the future of his family synonymous. It seems that there were two reasons for the unique manner in which Diagoras honored his family through statues and oral tradition.

The first was his affection for his family, especially his children. The second reason for this close association was as a personal angle. Diagoras likely rejected the altering of the legacy of mortal men in oral tales into immortal heroes due to their actions. Nigel Nicholson argues that Diagoras may have wanted to avoid being passed down through moral tradition and replaced with some kind of god or hero that would take the credit for his achievements. He wanted to lead his own legacy and get the credit for his athletic accomplishments. By embedding his children into his legacy, he could leave a personal footprint that emphasized his connections to his family and the areas of Greece in which he left his legacy. His legacy could be carried out through his children when they eventually spread around through the surrounding area, creating a sort of Diagoras diaspora. Those children would then always be anchored to Diagoras, the man who shared his victories with his children, thus cementing the boxer as a mortal athletic champion and not allowing a god-like figure to replace him in oral tradition.

== Tomb ==
In 2018, articles in the Turkish press claimed the tomb of Diagoras had been discovered. A pyramid-shaped structure on a hill near Turgut village south west of Marmaris, regarded by locals as the grave of a saint, was identified by unnamed archaeologists as his mausoleum. Many Turkish young men would take a handful of dirt from the area around the tomb as good luck ahead of joining the army to complete their military service. The Greek inscription, in letters of the Hellenistic period, refers to a Diagoras, slain in battle. They also mention his wife Aristomacha, a woman outstanding for her offspring and her moderation. Known for decades, the inscription was not associated by previous scholars with the famous 5th century Rhodian, given its distance from the island of Rhodes and the post-Classical lettering of the text. Turkish newspaper, Milliyet, reported that an inscription in the tomb, stating “I will be vigilant at the very top so as to ensure that no coward can come and destroy this grave,” was transcribed by experts.

== See also ==
- Ancient Greek boxing

== Sources ==
- Smith, William. Dictionary of Greek and Roman Biography and Mythology, Diagoras.
- Sfyroeras, Pavlos (1993). "Fireless Sacrifices: Pindar's Olympian 7 and the Panathenaic Festival". The American Journal of Philology. 114 (1): 1–26. doi:10.2307/295379. JSTOR 295379.
- Odes. Pindar. Diane Arnson Svarlien. 1990.
- Nicholson, Nigel (1 June 2018). "When Athletic Victory and Fatherhood Did Mix: The Commemoration of Diagoras of Rhodes". Bulletin of the Institute of Classical Studies. 61 (1): 42–63. doi:10.1111/2041-5370.12069. S2CID 158167394.
- Staff, N. (2018, May 22). Shrine in Turkey uncovered as tomb of ancient Greek boxer. Retrieved December 7, 2020, from https://neoskosmos.com/en/115755/shrine-in-turkey-uncovered-as-tomb-of-ancient-greek-boxer/
