= Battle of Phyle =

Military campaign in 404/403 BC

- Part of Phyle Campaign
- Map showing the three battles of the Phyle Campaign
Date	12 Boedromion 404 BC
Location	Near Phyle, Attica
Result	Athenian exile victory

Belligerents
Athenian exiles	Spartan garrison of Athens

Commanders and leaders
Thrasybulus	Callibius

Strength
700 infantry	700 infantry, two divisions of cavalry

Casualties and losses
Light	123 killed

The Battle of Phyle was fought between Athenian exiles who were seeking to restore democracy to Athens and a Spartan garrison trying to protect the oligarchic Thirty Tyrants. In the battle, 700 Athenian exiles under Thrasybulus decisively defeated Spartans and their Athenian cavalry in a dawn ambush.

== Prelude ==
Following Athens' defeat in the Peloponnesian War, a narrow oligarchic government was imposed on the city by Lysander and the victorious Spartans. This government, which came to be known as the Thirty Tyrants as a result of its brutal actions, exiled or drove away a number of citizens. Many of these gathered at Thebes, where they received support and assistance from the anti-Spartan government of Ismenias. Late in 404 BC, 70 of these exiles, commanded by Thrasybulus, crossed the border into Attica and occupied the strong point of Phyle on Mount Parnes.

The Thirty, seeking to dislodge this threat, marched out to attack Phyle, but, after an initial assault was repulsed, a snowstorm drove the force back to Athens. Meanwhile, more exiles began to arrive at Phyle, swelling the size of the force there. The Thirty dispatched the Spartan garrison of Athens, along with an Athenian cavalry force, to keep watch on Phyle and prevent the exiles from raiding the countryside.

== Battle ==
The Spartan force made its camp in a field two miles from Phyle, and from there kept watch on the area. By this time, however, so many exiles had come to Phyle that Thrasybulus was now in command of a 700-man force. With this army, he came down from Phyle at night and surrounded the Spartan camp; at dawn, the exiles attacked, catching the Spartan force in the midst of waking up. A total rout ensued; 120 hoplites, just under a fifth of the Spartan force, were killed, as were three cavalrymen. The defeated force fled back to Athens in disarray; after pursuing for a mile, the victorious exiles returned to Phyle.

== Aftermath ==
This unexpected defeat shook the confidence of the government at Athens, and the Thirty began shortly afterward to prepare a refuge for themselves at Eleusis by seizing and executing a number of potential dissenters there. The exiles, meanwhile, received a great boost in prestige from the victory, and new recruits swelled their numbers rapidly. Just a few days after the battle at Phyle, Thrasybulus led a force of 1000 men to Piraeus. There, he won another victory, after which the Thirty fled to Eleusis. A stalemate then ensued, with Thrasybulus and his men holding the Piraeus while a new oligarchic government held Athens; this was brought to a close when a Spartan force under Pausanias arrived; after fighting an inconclusive battle with the men from Phyle, Pausanias arranged a settlement that restored democratic governance to Athens.

The Athenians held sacrifices annually on 12 Boedromion, the anniversary of the victory.
