= Battle of Munychia =

404/403 BC Athenian defeat of the pro-Spartan Thirty Tyrants

Coordinates: 37.941°N 23.656°E

- Part of Phyle Campaign
- Map showing the three battles of the Phyle Campaign
Date	404 BC or 403 BC
Location	Munychia hill, in Piraeus
Result	Athenian exile victory

Belligerents
Athenian exiles	Thirty Tyrants

Commanders and leaders
Thrasybulus	Critias †

Strength
1,000	Several thousand

Casualties and losses
Light	70 killed

The Battle of Munychia was fought between Athenians exiled by the oligarchic government of the Thirty Tyrants and the forces of that government, supported by a Spartan garrison. In the battle, a substantially superior force composed of the Spartan garrison of Athens and the army of the oligarchic government attacked a hill in Piraeus (the Munychia) which had been seized by 1,000 exiles under Thrasybulus, but was defeated. After this defeat, the Thirty Tyrants were forced to flee to Eleusis.

== Prelude ==
In late 404 BC, Thrasybulus, with other Athenian exiles, had seized Phyle, a strong point on the Athenian border. He and his men resisted an abortive attempt to dislodge them and then, as their numbers were swelled by new recruits, ambushed the Spartan garrison of Athens, which had been dispatched to watch them. Shortly after this victory, the men from Phyle, now 1,000 strong, marched by night to Piraeus, the port of Athens. There, being too few to defend the entire port, they seized one of its prominent hills, the Munychia. The next morning, the forces of the Thirty marched out to meet them.

== Battle ==
The Athenian exiles drew up for battle in a formation ten ranks deep at the top of the Munychia, with light troops and spear throwers behind them. Below, in one of the markets of Piraeus, the joint Spartan-oligarchic force drew up in a formation of equal width, but fifty ranks deep. The Spartan garrison held the right, the forces of the Thirty the left. Xenophon's account of the battle states that Thrasybulus, to inspire his men, reminded them that the enemy right was composed of men whom they had routed a few days before, while the left was made up of men who had wrongly driven them from their country.

The oligarchic forces advanced up the road towards the top of the hill, but before they reached the top the men from Phyle charged down the hill at them. This charge broke the oligarchic line, and the exiles pursued their enemies down the hill onto the level ground. In this rout, seventy men of the Thirty's force were killed. Among the dead was Critias, the leader of the Thirty; several other prominent oligarchic leaders were also killed, including Charmides.

== Aftermath ==
After this battle, the prestige of the Thirty, already weakened by the earlier defeat near Phyle, was irreparably damaged. The next day the Thirty were deposed by a vote of the larger oligarchic governing body, the council of three thousand. The Thirty fled to Eleusis, and a governing board of ten was elected in their place. This new government, however, was not ready to compromise with the men in Piraeus, so envoys were sent to Sparta to request aid. A Spartan force under Pausanias was dispatched to deal with the situation; after a face saving victory at the Battle of Piraeus, Pausanias arranged a settlement between the oligarchs and exiles and restored democracy in Athens.
