= Phyle Campaign =

Civil war in Ancient Greece

The Phyle Campaign (404–403 BC) was an Athenian civil war that resulted in the overthrow of a Spartan imposed oligarchy on Athens (see Thirty Tyrants) and the restoration of Athenian democracy.

== Prelude ==
The Thirty were short of funds and this led them to persecute wealthy Athenians of whatever political views. Many fled to Boeotia and Corinth who offered asylum in defiance of Sparta.

== The campaign ==
Map showing Phyle during the Phyle Campaign

The Thirty Tyrants had left Athens' border forts ungarrisoned, both out of deference to Sparta and because of their cash shortage. This allowed a group of Athenian exiles to seize the fort of Phyle in 404/403 BCE. The leader of the exiles, initially only some 70 strong, was Thrasybulus, who had a reputation as a moderate democrat, and thus was ideal to unite all democratic opponents of the Thirty. A force of Athenian cavalry and Spartans was sent against Phyle, but was defeated in two surprise attacks by Thrasybulus at the Battle of Phyle. Thrasybulus then marched on Piraeus and defeated the force the Thirty sent against him at the Battle of Munychia.

Sparta first responded by sending Lysander with a force of mercenaries who clearly intended simply to restore the Thirty to power. Very quickly, however, Sparta sent King Pausanias with a levy of the Peloponnesian League. Pausanias defeated the democrats in the Battle of Piraeus. However he opened negotiations and accepted the restoration of democracy, nevertheless insisting on the separation of Eleusis as a safe haven for the oligarchs.

== Aftermath ==
Lysander's faction at Sparta was furious and along with King Agis brought Pausanias to trial to the end of 403 BCE. The exact charge is uncertain but the essence was presumably that he had been soft on Athens. Fifteen of the Gerousia, including Agis, voted guilty, but fourteen Gerousia, as well as all five Ephors, voted not guilty so he was acquitted.

== Bibliography ==
- Cartledge, Paul (1987). Agesilaos and the Crisis of Sparta. Duckworth. ISBN 978-0715630327.
