= Harpagion =

Town of the ancient Troad

Coordinates: 40°20′03″N 27°23′31″E

Harpagion (Ancient Greek: Ἁρπάγιον) was a town of the ancient Troad, or of Mysia mentioned by Thucydides. Its territory was called Harpageia (τὰ Ἁρπαγεῖα) or Harpagia (Ἁρπάγια). It lay between Priapus and Cyzicus, near the mouth of the river Granicus. It belonged to the Delian League since it appears in tribute records of Athens between the years 448/7 and 429/8 BCE. Thucydides writes that three days after the Battle of Cynossema, during the Peloponnesian War, the Athenians captured eight ships coming from Byzantium at Harpagion and Priapus.

According to some myths Ganymede was snatched from there.

Its site is located in Asiatic Turkey.
