= Enkidu (crater) =

Crater on Ganymede

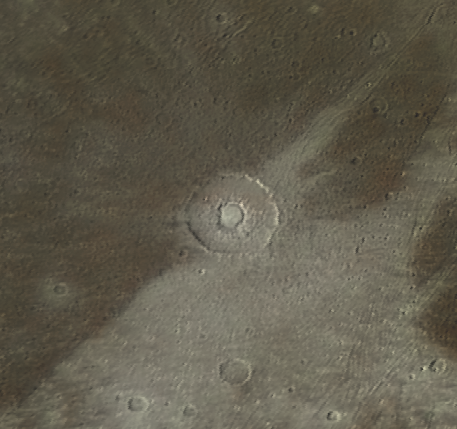
- A narrow-angle image of Enkidu crater, taken by Voyager 1 on 5 March 1979
- Feature type: Dome ray crater
- Coordinates: 26.61°S 325.13°W
- Diameter: 122 kilometres (76 mi)
- Eponym: Enkidu

Enkidu is a prominent and bright ray crater with a dome on Jupiter's largest moon Ganymede. It has a dome at its center and clearly exhibits rays only in the southeast direction. The crater is 122 kilometres (76 mi) wide.

== Naming ==
Enkidu is named after Enkidu, a character from the ancient Mesopotamian story called the Epic of Gilgamesh. Enkidu was a wild man who became friends with Gilgamesh, the protagonist of the story, after neither of them could defeat the other in a fierce wrestling match. Together, the two went on many adventures until the gods decided that Enkidu should die, spurring Gilgamesh to begin his famous quest for immortality.

The name for Enkidu was approved in 1982 by the International Astronomical Union (IAU), the organization responsible for formally naming celestial bodies and their geological features, following the convention that craters on Ganymede should be named after deities, heroes, and places from Middle Eastern mythology, including Mesopotamian mythology from the Epic of Gilgamesh.

== Location ==
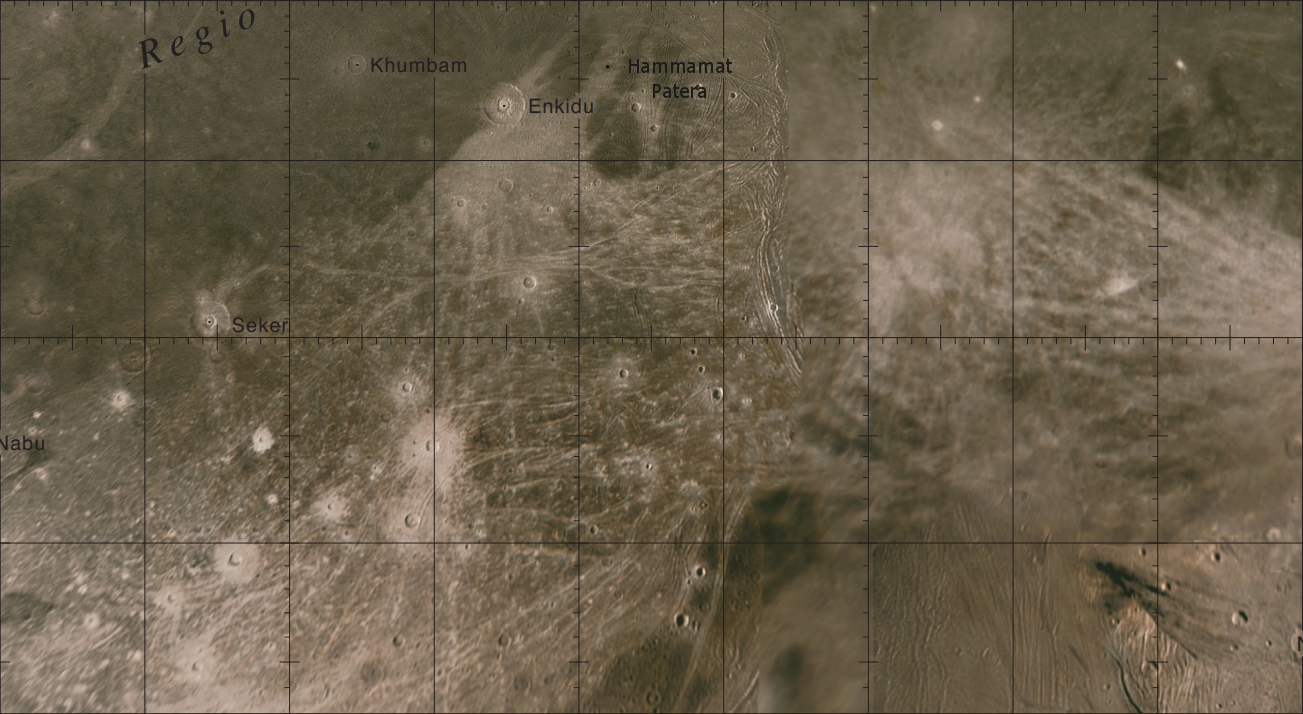
The Namtar quadrangle on Ganymede. Enkidu's location can be seen on the map.

Enkidu is located in the southeast corner of an extensive, dark, ancient region on Ganymede called Nicholson Regio. It sits almost exactly at the boundary between the dark region of Nicholson and the bright groove terrain Borsippa Sulcus to the south. To Enkidu's northeast are the surface depression called Hammamat Patera and another bright region called Harpagia Sulcus. To the west lies a large crater called Khumbam, while to the southwest, the crater Seker is situated. Enkidu is located within the Namtar quadrangle (or section) of Ganymede (designated Jg14).

Enkidu is located within the hemisphere of Ganymede that always faces its parent planet. This is due to the moon's synchronous rotation around Jupiter. As a result, an observer standing at Enkidu would always see Jupiter in the sky.

== Age ==
Enkidu is a fresh ray crater. Its ray system is very bright because the crater is relatively new, and not enough time has passed for the rays to be erased by space weathering. Enkidu is the youngest surface feature in the Nicholson Regio area, and it is believed to have formed shortly after the formation of the younger bright terrains nearby, such as Borsippa Sulcus. This relationship with the bright terrain places constraints on the age of Enkidu, ranging from 3.79 to 3.72 billion years (based on the lunar-derived model) to 0.99 to 1.37 billion years (based on the Jupiter-comet model). Conversely, the age and presence of young ray craters such as Enkidu can be used as stratigraphic markers in determining when the formation of bright terrains on Ganymede stopped.

== Morphology ==
The massive asteroid or comet that struck Ganymede and created Enkidu excavated large amounts of bright, icy material from beneath the moon's surface, flinging it in all directions around the impact site and forming a bright ray system. Both the inside of the crater and its rays are equally very bright and fresh-looking.

Unlike most other ray systems on Ganymede, one notable feature of Enkidu is its striking discontinuous ray system. Its bright rays can be clearly seen radiating toward the southeastern half of the crater and into the bright Borsippa Sulcus terrain, whereas the rays extending toward the dark Nicholson Regio to the northwest are very dark and difficult to see. It is therefore inferred that the impact failed to penetrate the icy subsurface of Nicholson Regio. Assuming an excavation depth of 7.8 kilometres (4.8 mi) from the asteroid impact, Enkidu would have fully penetrated the icy subsurface of the dark terrain in Nicholson Regio, excavating bright ejecta material that is still observable today. Dark materials from Nicholson Regio may have later been transported into this portion of the crater during crater modification, particularly by the smaller crater superimposed on it.

Many craters within a 600 kilometres (370 mi) radius are believed to have formed from secondary cratering from Enkidu.

== Geology ==
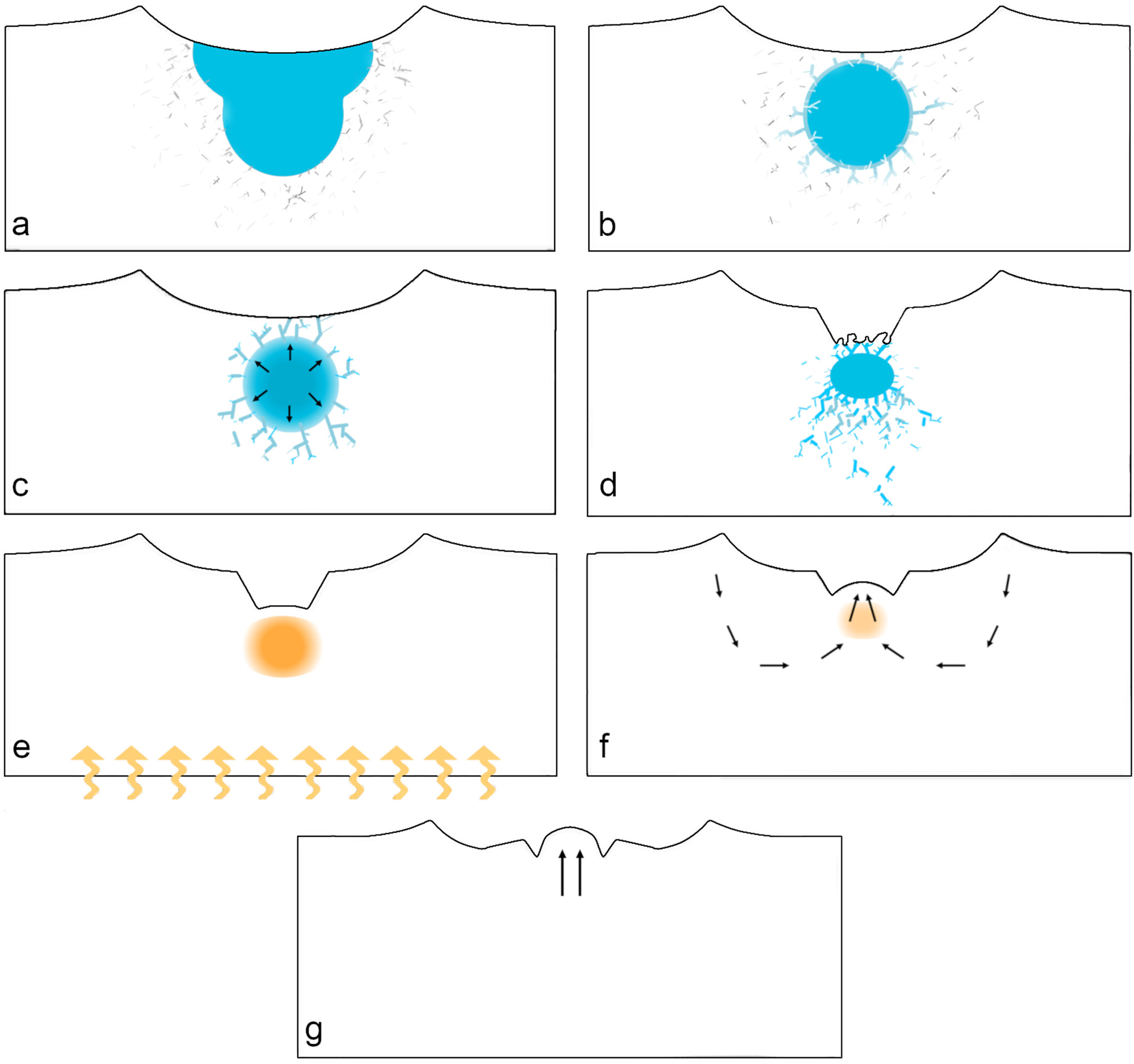
A diagram illustrating the formation of dome craters on icy moons. It shows how the refreezing of meltwater from meteorite impacts can create sinkholes, forming pit craters, and how the subsequent expansion of the freezing meltwater pushes up the crater floor to form an icy dome.

Enkidu is an intermediate-sized crater with an outer rim 122 kilometres (76 mi) wide, and it is one of Ganymede's dome craters. Spectral analyses strongly suggest that the bright materials within the crater and its rays are composed of pure, fresh water ice. Fresh water ice is a good reflector of sunlight, making Enkidu shine brightly compared to the darker, older, and more contaminated neighboring Nicholson Regio.

According to research, the central dome of Enkidu was formed by meltwater generated beneath the crater when the heat from the asteroid impact melted Ganymede's icy surface. As the meltwater refroze, it created cracks and damage beneath the crater, leading to the collapse of the crater's center and the formation of a circular pit similar to a sinkhole. Continued freezing of the meltwater caused it to expand, pushing up the crater's center and forming an icy dome. Such domes typically form only in craters wider than 60 kilometres (37 mi).

== Exploration and Observation ==
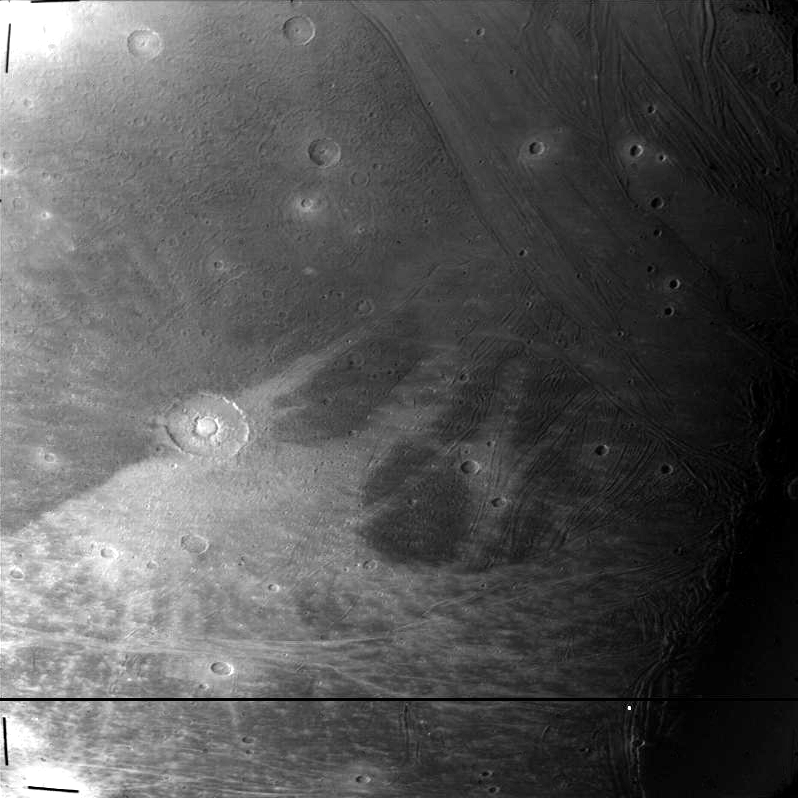
Enkidu crater (slightly left from the center) as seen in this narrow-angle image of Ganymede, taken by Voyager 1 in March 1979. Hammamat Patera is at the center of the image, while Borsippa Sulcus lies at the lower part.

As of 2026, the only spacecraft that was able to image Enkidu was Voyager 1 during the probe's quick flyby to Ganymede and Jupiter in March 1979. It captured multiple images of Enkidu and its surrounding terrain, which remain the only clear views of the crater to date.

Galileo was able to image the areas north and east of Enkidu during its flyby of Ganymede in April 2000; However, the probe was not able to return any images of the crater itself.

=== Future missions ===
The European Space Agency's (ESA) flagship mission called the Jupiter Icy Moons Explorer (Juice) is scheduled to arrive at Jupiter in July 2031. After spending approximately three and a half years in orbit around Jupiter and performing multiple flybys of Europa, Ganymede and Callisto, Juice will settle into a low orbit around Ganymede at a distance of as low as 500 kilometres (310 mi) in 2034. Juice is expected to photograph Enkidu in great detail, allowing planetary scientists to understand the relationship between the crater's age and the ages of the surrounding dark and bright terrains.

== See also ==
- List of craters on Ganymede
- Meteor
