= Hammamat Patera =

Surface depression and possible ice volcano on Ganymede

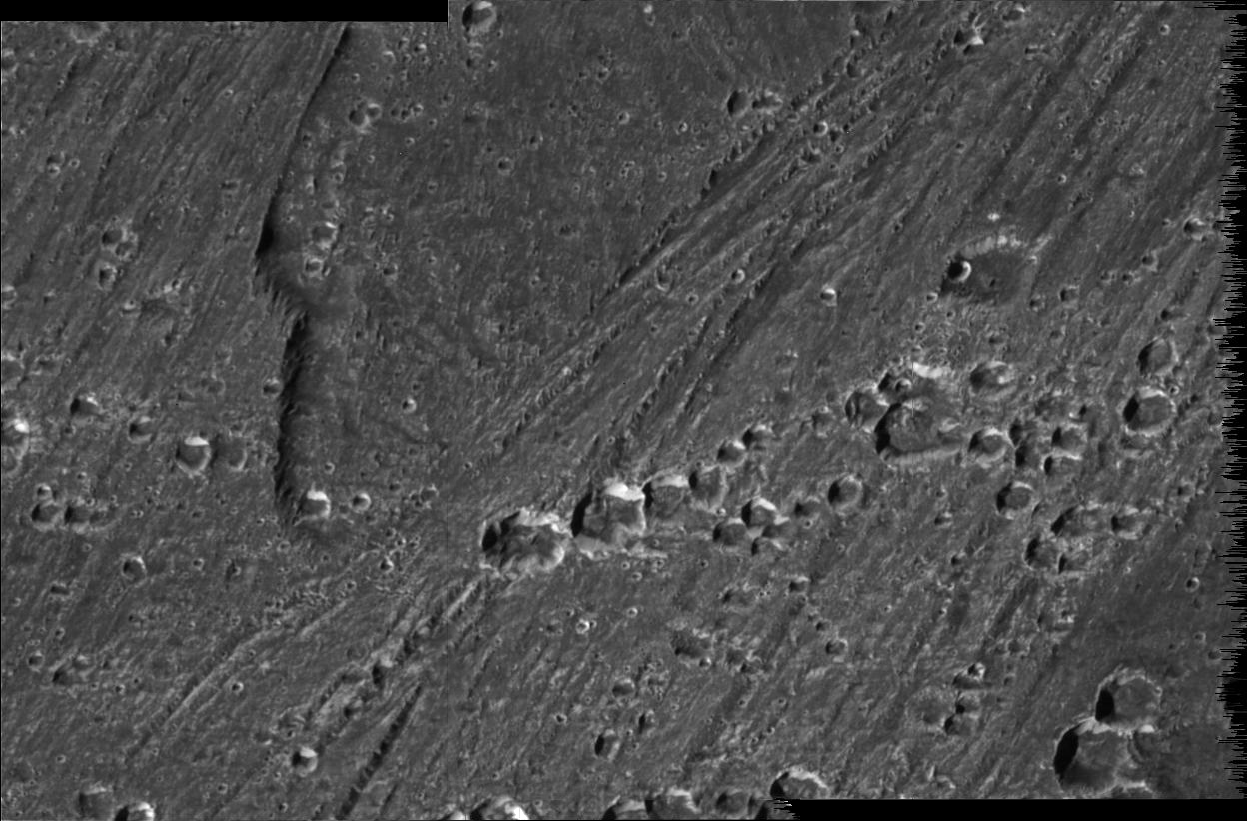
- A mosaic image of Hammamat Patera, taken by the Galileo space probe on May 20, 2000.
- Feature type: Patera
- Coordinates: 24.23°S 318.10°W
- Diameter: 45 km (28 mi)
- Eponym: Wadi Hammamat

Hammamat Patera is a small surface depression on Ganymede, the largest moon of Jupiter. At only about 45 km (28 mi) in diameter, this depression is roughly triangular in shape with curvilinear sides and cliffs. It is considered a potential ground-level cryovolcano caldera.

== Naming ==
Hammamat Patera is named after a dried-up wadi in Eastern Egypt. Wadis are desert river valleys that are usually dry and they flow with water only during periods of heavy rainfall. In the past, Hammamat connected the Nile River to the Red Sea, facilitating trade between Egypt and India, which contributed greatly to the prosperity of both nations. Hammamat is also famous as a former mining region for gold and stones such as sandstone and quartz.

The International Astronomical Union's (IAU) chose the name in accordance with the convention that stipulate that paterae on Ganymede should be named after wadi river valleys in the Middle East. Egypt is traditionally considered a part of the Middle East. The name was approved by the IAU in March 2015.

== Location ==
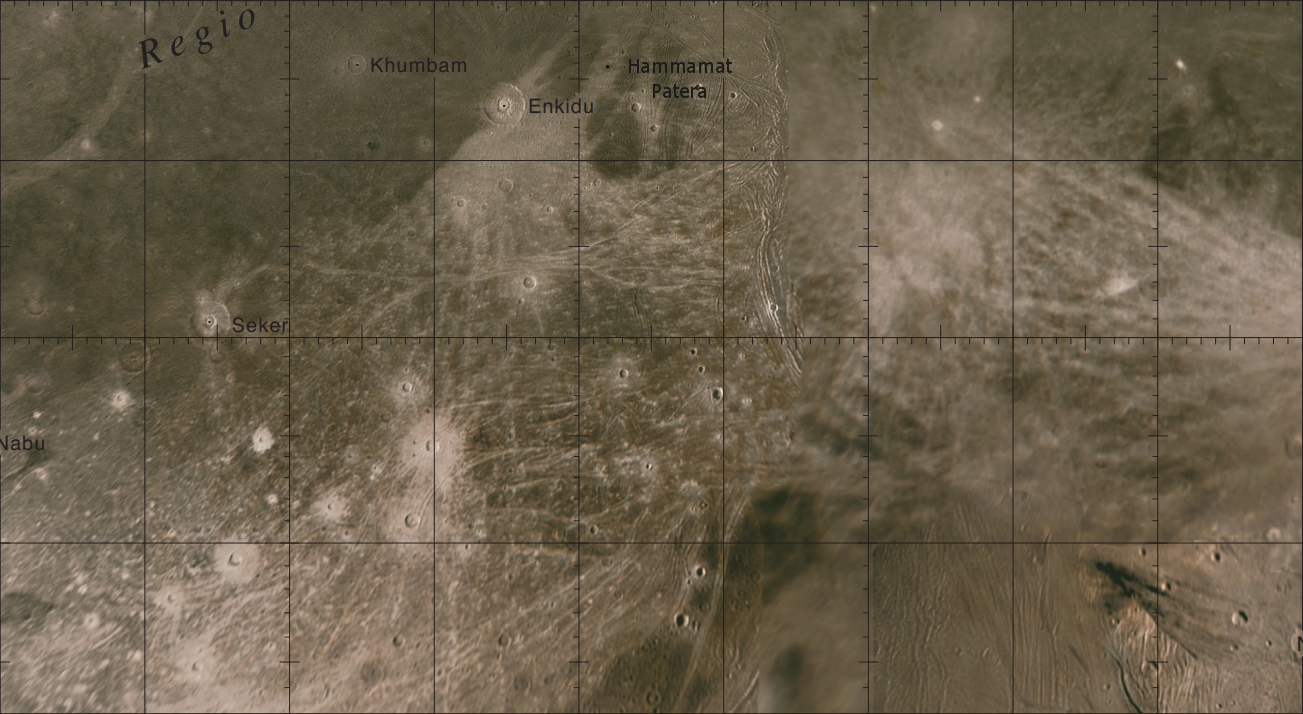
A map of Namtar quadrangle, showing the location of Hammamat Patera.

Hammamat Patera is located in Ganymede’s southern hemisphere, within a region of alternating bright and dark terrain known as Borsippa Sulcus. To its west lie the bright ray crater Enkidu and the ancient dark region known as Nicholson Regio. To the east and northeast lies the extensive bright terrain of Harpagia Sulcus.

Due to its proximity to the ray crater Enkidu, the region surrounding Hammamat Patera is dominated by secondary craters that formed from ejecta produced by Enkidu.

Hammamat Patera is situated within the Namtar quadrangle (or section) of Ganymede (designated Jg14).

According to the maps of Ganymede published by the United States Geological Survey (USGS), Hammamat Patera is located within Borsippa Sulcus, while other studies such as those of Namitha Baby place it within Harpagia Sulcus.

Due to Ganymede’s synchronous rotation as it orbits Jupiter, one hemisphere of the moon always faces its parent planet while the opposite side never does. Hammamat Patera is located on the hemisphere that always faces Jupiter. As a result, an observer at Hammamat Patera would always see Jupiter in the same position in the sky at all times. (Note: For moons in synchronous rotation, such as Ganymede, 0° longitude corresponds to the part of the surface that always faces Jupiter. Regions between 270° W to 0° to 90° W longitude always face the moon’s parent planet.)

== Potential Cryovolcanism ==
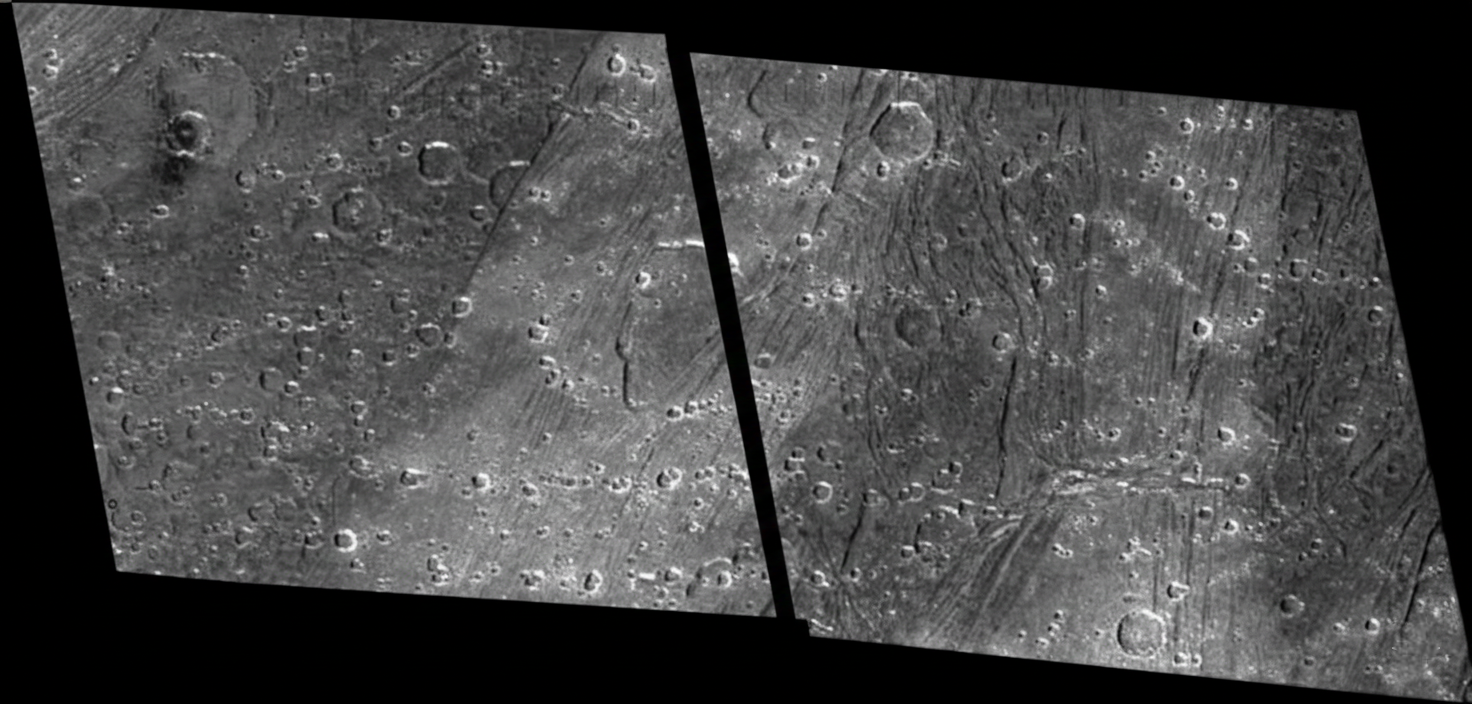
A mosaic image centered on Hammamat Patera, showing the patera and its surrounding region, as imaged by Galileo in May 2000.

Preliminary analyses suggest that Hammamat Patera may be a ground-level cryovolcanic caldera on Ganymede. The patera’s open rim, along with its slightly lobate outline and margins, suggests that slushy material (analogous to flowing lava on Earth) once moved through the area. On Ganymede, terrestrial lava is replaced by slushy water ice.

Ultimately, as of 2026, studies of whether paterae on Ganymede are cryovolcanic in origin remain inconclusive, as other secondary processes such as mass wasting or fracturing may also contribute to the formation of these geological features. Future higher-resolution imaging and spectroscopic observations of these regions are required to conclusively determine whether paterae on Ganymede are cryovolcanic in origin.

== Exploration ==
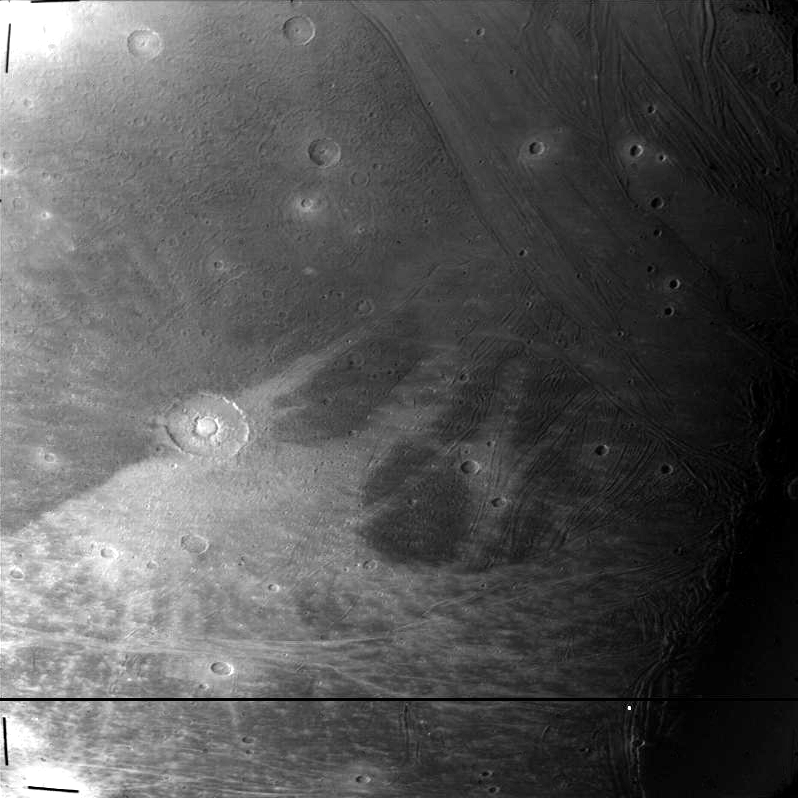
An image of Borsippa Sulcus, with Hammamat Patera at the center. The patera is small and relatively difficult to see in this scale. This image was taken by Voyager 1 in March 1979. The bright crater to the left is Enkidu crater.

Although Voyager 1 captured images of Hammamat Patera during its flyby of Ganymede in March 1979, the crater was too small and the spacecraft was not close enough to resolve any surface details.

Galileo was the first probe to provide excellent-quality images of Hammamat Patera during its orbit around Jupiter between December 1995 and September 2003. In May 2000, during its G28 encounter of Ganymede, Galileo was able to resolve details as small as 45 m (148 ft)/pixel around the patera.

=== Future Missions ===
The European Space Agency's (ESA) space probe called the Jupiter Icy Moons Explorer (Juice) is currently on its way to Jupiter. The probe will arrive at Jupiter in July 2031 and, in 2034, Juice is expected to settle into a low orbit around Ganymede at a distance of just 500 kilometres (310 mi) after spending around three and a half in orbit around Jupiter. Hammamat Patera is considered a high-priority target for Juice, as high-resolution imaging of the patera may help resolve the long-standing question of whether cryovolcanoes exist on Ganymede or not.

== See also ==
List of geological features on Ganymede
