= Battle of Abydos =

411 BCE naval engagement between Athens and Sparta, part of the Peloponnesian War

- Part of Peloponnesian War
Date	November 411 BC
Location	Near Abydos, in the Hellespont (modern-day Nara Burnu, Çanakkale, Turkey)
Result	Athenian victory

Belligerents
Athens	Sparta and allies

Commanders and leaders
Thrasybulus, Thrasyllus, Alcibiades	Mindarus

Strength
74 ships + 18 ships (reinforcement)	97 ships

Casualties and losses
Minimal	30 ships

The Battle of Abydos was an Athenian naval victory in the Peloponnesian War. In the battle, the Spartan fleet, under Mindarus, attempted to rescue a small allied fleet that had been driven ashore at Dardanus, but was attacked by the Athenian fleet, under Thrasybulus. The fighting was evenly contested for a great length of time, but towards evening, the arrival of Alcibiades with Athenian reinforcements tipped the balance in favor of the Athenians, and the Peloponnesians were forced to flee back to their base at Abydos, suffering heavy losses along the way.

== Prelude ==
After the Athenian victory at Cynossema, the Athenian fleet established a base at Sestos, from where it could quickly respond to any moves by the Spartan fleet at Abydos. Mindarus, the Spartan navarch, summoned the Rhodian commander Dorieus, with his 14 ships, to join him at Abydos, hoping to end the war with a decisive victory. Dorieus, accordingly, sailed north from Rhodes towards the Hellespont. Before reaching Abydos, however, he was spotted by Athenian lookouts and driven ashore. Xenophon reports that he was trapped at Rhoeteum, while Diodorus Siculus reports the location as Dardanus; Donald Kagan suggests that Dorieus was driven ashore at Rhoeteum, then managed to advance a little farther towards Abydos before being trapped a second time at Dardanus.

Learning of Dorieus's plight, Mindarus hurried from Troy, where he had been sacrificing to Athena, to Abydos, while Pharnabazus brought his army up to support Dorieus from the land. Mindarus led his ships out from Abydos to rescue Dorieus; the Athenians, observing this, set out from Sestos to challenge him.

== Battle ==
Mindarus, after joining forces with Dorieus, had 97 ships under his command; the Athenian fleet contained 74 ships. The Spartans lined up for battle with the Asian shore of the Hellespont at their backs, with Mindarus commanding the right and the Syracusans holding the left; the Athenians lined up opposite them, with Thrasybulus commanding the right and Thrasyllus the left. The battle began with a signal from the commanders, which was relayed to the fleet by trumpeters. An evenly matched fight ensued, with pilots attempting to ram and disable enemy triremes, while marines on the decks engaged their opposite numbers whenever they came within range of an opposing ship. As the day wore on, neither side was able to gain a decisive advantage until Alcibiades appeared with 18 triremes from Samos. Initially, both fleets believed that the reinforcements might be theirs, but as Alcibiades drew nearer he ran up a red flag, a prearranged signal that told the Athenians the ships were their own. Realizing this, the Spartan fleet fled to Abydos, but suffered heavy losses along the way, as the Athenians attacked the strung out ships. All told, the Athenians captured 30 Spartan ships and recovered the 15 of their own that the Spartans had taken at the Battle of Cynossema.

== Aftermath ==
In the wake of this serious defeat, Mindarus and the Spartan fleet returned to Abydos to repair and rebuild; Mindarus sent to Sparta for reinforcements and, with Pharnabazus, planned for future campaigns. The Athenians, meanwhile, were unable to press the advantage they had gained. With their treasury low and a crisis ongoing at Euboea, which was in revolt, the Athenians were unable to keep their entire fleet in the Hellespont, and instead dispatched 30 ships under Theramenes to attack the rebels on Euboea. Although unable to prevent the rebels from building a causeway to Boeotia, he did succeed in raising a substantial amount of money by plundering hostile territory in Euboea, Boeotia, and the Aegean.

Shortly after the battle, the satrap Tissaphernes arrived from Ionia. Alcibiades, who had served as Tissaphernes' assistant for a time and wished to demonstrate that he was influential with the satrap, sailed to meet him, bringing gifts. It turned out, however, that Alcibiades had misjudged the situation. The Spartans had complained to the Persian king about the tepid support they had received from Tissaphernes, and the satrap, needing to demonstrate his commitment to opposing actions, arrested Alcibiades and imprisoned him at Sardis. Alcibiades escaped within a month, but his claims of influence with Tissaphernes were destroyed.
