= Kallipateira of Rhodes =

5th-century BC Greek athlete

Kallipateira (Gr. Καλλιπάτειρα) of Ialysos in Rhodes (l. c. 388 BCE), was an Ancient Greek athlete trainer. She came from a renowned family of athletes in Ancient Greece. She was caught attending the ancient Olympic Games disguised as a male trainer in 388 BCE. Her capture led to a law being introduced that trainers should strip before entering the stadium.

== Family ==
Kallipateira was a granddaughter of Damagetos, king of Ialysos. Her father, Diagoras of Rhodes, was a celebrated boxer and Olympic victor. Diagoras won the boxing at several Panhellenic games and was honoured by Pindar. Her brothers were also Panhellenic champions: Damagetos won pankration events and Akousilaos won in boxing. Her younger brother Dorieus was the most successful, winning the pankration at 21 different Panhellenic games.

Kallipateira was a widow at the time of her arrest at Olympia, which she was attending in support of her own son Peisirodos.

== Capture at Olympia ==
Pausanias records the story of how she was caught:

It is a law of Elis to cast down it [Mount Typaion] any women who are caught present at the Olympic games, or even on the other side of the Alpheius, on the days prohibited to women. However, they say that no woman has been caught, except Kallipateira only; some, however, give the lady the name of Pherenike and not Kallipateira. She, being a widow, disguised herself exactly like a gymnastic trainer, and brought her son to compete at Olympia. Peisirodus, for so her son was called, was victorious, and Kallipateira, as she was jumping over the enclosure in which they keep the trainers shut up, bared her person. So her sex was discovered, but they let her go unpunished out of respect for her father, her brothers and her son, all of whom had been victorious at Olympia. But a law was passed that for the future trainers should strip before entering the arena.

Her story features in a sonnet of the modern Greek poet Lorentzos Mavilis.
