= 403rd =

403rd or 403d may refer to:

- 403d Bombardment Squadron, inactive United States Air Force unit
- 403d Operations Group, the operational flying component of the United States Air Force Reserve 403d Wing
- 403d Wing, unit of the United States Air Force assigned to the Air Force Reserve Command
- 403rd Infantry Brigade, known officially as the Peacemaker Brigade, one of the brigades of the Philippine Army

== See also ==
- 403 (number)
- 403, the year 403 (CDIII) of the Julian calendar
- 403 BC
