= Thrasybulus =

Athenian general and politician (c. 440 – 388 BC)

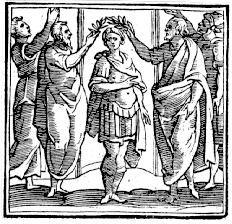
- Thrasybulus receiving an olive crown for his successful campaign against the Thirty Tyrants. From Andrea Alciato's Emblemata.
- Born: c. 455–441 BC
- Died: 388 BC (aged 53–67); Aspendos (modern-day Serik, Antalya, Turkey)
- Military career
- Allegiance: Athens
- Rank: Strategos
- Conflicts: Peloponnesian War; Battle of Cynossema; Battle of Abydos; Battle of Cyzicus; Battle of Arginusae; Phyle Campaign; Battle of Phyle; Battle of Munychia; Battle of Piraeus; Corinthian War; Battle of Nemea; Battle of Coronea

Thrasybulus (/ˌθræsɪˈbjuːləs/; Ancient Greek: Θρασύβουλος Thrasyboulos; c. 440 – 388 BC) was a Greek general and democratic leader. In 411 BC, in the wake of an oligarchic coup at Athens, the pro-democracy sailors at Samos elected him as a general, making him a primary leader of the ultimately successful democratic resistance to the coup. As general, he was responsible for recalling the controversial nobleman Alcibiades from exile, and the two worked together extensively over the next several years. In 411 and 410, Thrasybulus was in command along with Alcibiades and others at several critical Athenian naval victories.

After Athens's defeat in the Peloponnesian War, Thrasybulus led the democratic resistance to the new oligarchic government, known as the Thirty Tyrants, imposed by the victorious Spartans upon Athens. In 404 BC, he commanded a small force of exiles that invaded the Spartan-ruled Attica and, in successive battles, first defeated a Spartan garrison and then the forces of the oligarchy. In the wake of these victories, democracy was re-established at Athens. As a leader of this revived democracy in the 4th century BC, Thrasybulus advocated a policy of resistance to Sparta and sought to restore Athens's imperial power. He was killed in 388 BC while leading an Athenian naval force during the Corinthian War.

== Personal life and early career ==
Almost nothing is known of Thrasybulus's background or early life. His father was named Lycus, and he was a native of the deme of Steiria in Athens. He was probably born between 455 and 441 BC, although dates as late as the later 430s BC have been suggested. He was married, and had two children. Several facts make it clear that he was from a wealthy family; he held the office of trierarch, which involved significant personal expenditures on several occasions, and in the 4th century BC his son was able to pay a substantial fine of 10 talents.

By 411 Thrasybulus had established a reputation as a pro-democracy politician. Throughout his career, Thrasybulus consistently advocated several policies. He was a proponent of Athenian imperialism and expansionism and a strong supporter of Periclean democracy. According to Demosthenes, Thrasybulus was one of the "great and distinguished orators." Plutarch notes that he had "the loudest voice of the Athenians." And the Athenian general Conon described Thrasybulus as a man who was "bold in counsel." During his period of prominence within the democracy, he seems to have led what might now be termed a populist faction. According to the historical account provided by Xenophon, he was murdered by locals during the night while acting as general of a military expedition on its way to Rhodes while on a stopover in Aspendus on the Eurymedon River on account of his soldiers' recent transgressions against local farmers and their farmsteads.

== Coup of 411 BC ==
In 413 BC, a massive Athenian expedition force was obliterated in Sicily. In the wake of this defeat, Athens found itself facing a crisis of unprecedented magnitude. Cities throughout its Aegean empire began to rebel, and a Peloponnesian fleet sailed to assist them. Seeking to contain the crisis, Athens tapped its reserve fund to rebuild its fleet and dispatched what ships it had to establish an advance naval base at Samos.

In this general atmosphere of crisis, aristocrats at Athens who had long desired to overthrow the democracy there began to agitate publicly for a change of government, and formed a conspiracy to bring an oligarchy to power in Athens. Their plans included recalling Alcibiades, who had been exiled by the democratic government. These oligarchs initiated their plans at Samos, where they successfully encouraged a number of Samian oligarchs to begin a similar conspiracy.

A dispute has arisen among modern historians over Thrasybulus's involvement in this plot. Donald Kagan has suggested that Thrasybulus was one of the founding members of the scheme and was willing to support moderate oligarchy, but was alienated by the extreme actions taken by the plotters. R. J. Buck, on the other hand, maintains that Thrasybulus was probably never involved in the plot, possibly because he was absent from Samos at the time of its inception.

Upon their return to Athens, the conspirators succeeded in ending democratic rule and imposing an oligarchy of 400 rulers. At Samos, however, the coup did not go forward as smoothly. Samian democrats learned of the conspiracy and notified four prominent Athenians, the generals Leon and Diomedon, Thrasybulus, and Thrasyllus, at that time a hoplite in the ranks. With the support of these men and the Athenian soldiers and sailors in general, the Samian democrats were able to defeat the conspirators when they attempted to seize power.

A ship was dispatched to Athens to notify the city of this success against the oligarchs. Upon its arrival, however, the crew was arrested, as the news of a democratic victory was far from welcome to the new oligarchic government. Learning of this, the army at Samos deposed its generals and elected new generals who were believed to be more steadfast in their support of democracy, Thrasybulus and Thrasyllus among them. The army, stating that they had not revolted from the city but that the city had revolted from them, resolved to stand by the democracy while continuing to prosecute the war against Sparta.

One of the first actions Thrasybulus took as general was to bring about the recall of Alcibiades, a policy that he had supported since before the coup. After persuading the sailors to support his plan, Thrasybulus sailed to retrieve Alcibiades and returned with him to Samos. The aim of this policy was to win away Persian support from the Spartans, as it was believed that Alcibiades had great influence with Tissaphernes. Alcibiades was elected as general alongside Thrasybulus and the others. Shortly after this, following the revolt of Euboea, the government of the 400 at Athens was overthrown and replaced by a broader oligarchy, which would eventually give way to democracy.

== In command ==
In the months following these events, Thrasybulus commanded the Athenian fleet in several major engagements. At the Battle of Cynossema, he commanded the right wing of the fleet and prevented Athenian defeat by extending his flank to prevent encirclement; the battle ended in Athenian victory. Shortly afterwards Thrasybulus again commanded a wing of the Athenian fleet at the Battle of Abydos, another Athenian victory.

The Athenian strategy at Cyzicus. Left: Alcibiades's decoy force (blue) lures the Spartan fleet (black) out to sea. Right: Thrasybulus and Theramenes bring their squadrons in behind the Spartans to cut off their retreat towards Cyzicus, while Alcibiades turns to face the pursuing force.

Thrasybulus was again in command of a squadron of the Athenian fleet at the Battle of Cyzicus, a stunning Athenian victory. In this battle, the Athenians drew the Spartan fleet out to pursue a small force led by Alcibiades; when the Spartans had gotten a good distance from land, two squadrons under the command of Thrasybulus and Theramenes appeared in their rear to cut off their retreat. The Spartans were forced to flee to a nearby beach, where Alcibiades landed his men in an attempt to seize the Spartan ships. The Spartans, however, with the assistance of a Persian army, began to drive this Athenian force into the sea; seeing this, Thrasybulus landed his own force to temporarily relieve pressure on Alcibiades, and meanwhile ordered Theramenes to join up with Athenian land forces nearby and bring them to reinforce the sailors and marines on the beach. The Spartans and Persians, overwhelmed by the arrival of multiple forces from several directions, were defeated and driven off, and the Athenians captured all the Spartan ships which were not destroyed.

In 409 and 408, Thrasybulus remained in command, but his actions are difficult to trace. He appears to have spent much of the time campaigning in Thrace, recapturing cities for the empire and restoring the flow of tribute from the region. In 407 BC, he was in command of a fleet sent to besiege Phocaea; this siege had to be lifted, however, after the Spartans under Lysander defeated the main Athenian fleet at Notium. This defeat led to the downfall and exile of Alcibiades. Thrasybulus was either removed from command on the spot by Alcibiades or not reelected at the end of his term; either way, he was out of office from then until the end of the war.

Thrasybulus did return to action, however, at the Battle of Arginusae in 406 BC. There, he was a trierarch in the Athenian relief fleet sent out to assist the admiral Conon, who was blockaded at Mytilene. That battle was a major Athenian victory; after the battle, the generals in charge took the majority of their ships to attack the Peloponnesian fleet blockading Conon, leaving behind a force under Thrasybulus and his fellow trierarch Theramenes to rescue the survivors. This operation was thwarted, however, by a sudden storm which drove the rescue force to land, and a great number of Athenians—estimates as to the precise figure have ranged from near 1,000 to as many as 5,000—drowned. The result was one of the great Athenian political scandals of the war, which culminated in a vicious debate between Theramenes and the generals at Athens over who was to blame for the disaster, after which the generals were executed. Thrasybulus, for unknown reasons, seems to have had very little involvement in this debate.

== The Thirty Tyrants ==
In 404 BC, following a defeat at the Battle of Aegospotami, Athens was forced to surrender, ending the Peloponnesian War. In the wake of this surrender, the Spartan navarch Lysander imposed a strict oligarchic government on Athens, which came to be known as the Thirty Tyrants. This government executed a number of citizens and deprived all but a few of their rights, eventually growing so extreme that even the moderate oligarch Theramenes fell afoul of the government and was executed. Fearing for their lives, numerous Athenians fled to Thebes.

Thrasybulus had been one of the first to oppose the oligarchy and had been exiled to Thebes shortly after its rise to power. There, he was welcomed and supported by the Theban leader Ismenias and his followers, who assisted him in preparing for a return to Athens. In 403 BC, he led a party of 70 exiles to seize Phyle, a defensible location on the border of Attica and Boeotia. A storm prevented the forces of the Thirty from expelling him immediately, and numerous exiles flocked to join him. When the Spartan garrison of Athens, supported by Athenian cavalry, was sent out to oppose him, Thrasybulus led his force, now 700 strong, in a surprise daybreak raid on their camp, killing 120 Spartans and putting the rest to flight.

Five days later, Thrasybulus led his force, which had already grown to the point that he could leave 200 men at Phyle while taking 1,000 with him, to Piraeus, the port of Athens. There, he fortified the Munychia, a hill that dominated the port, and awaited the coming attack. The forces of the Thirty, supported by the Spartan garrison, marched to Piraeus to attack him. Thrasybulus and his men were outnumbered 5 to 1, but held a superior position and presumably benefited from consternation amidst the ranks of the oligarchs. In the battle, the exiles put the oligarchic forces to flight, killing Critias, the leader of the Thirty.

After this victory, the remainder of the Thirty fled to Eleusis, and the oligarchs within Athens began squabbling amongst themselves. New leaders were selected, but were unable to deal with Thrasybulus, and were forced to send to Sparta for help. The Spartans, however, did not send the aggressive Lysander, but the more conservative Pausanias. Pausanias's force narrowly defeated Thrasybulus's men, but only with great effort, and, unwilling to push the issue, he arranged a settlement between the forces of Thrasybulus and the oligarchs in the city. Democracy was restored, while those oligarchs who wished to do so withdrew to Eleusis. In power, Thrasybulus pushed through a law which pardoned all but a few of the oligarchs, preventing a brutal reprisal by the victorious democrats. For his actions, Thrasybulus was awarded an olive crown by his countrymen.

== Later actions ==
In the revived democracy established in 403 BC, Thrasybulus became a major and prestigious leader, although he was soon superseded at the head of the state by Archinus. Thrasybulus seems to have advocated a more radically democratic policy than the populace was willing to accept at the time; he called for reinstating pay for political service, and sought to extend citizenship to all the metics and foreigners who had fought alongside him against the Thirty. He was initially cautious about offending Sparta, but, when Persian support became available at the start of the Corinthian War, he became an advocate of aggressive action, and about this time seems to have regained his preeminence in Athenian politics. He initiated the rebuilding of the Long Walls, which had been demolished at the end of the Peloponnesian War, and commanded the Athenian contingents at Nemea and Coronea; these two defeats, however, damaged his political stature, and he was replaced at the head of the state by Conon, whose victory at Cnidus had ended Sparta's dreams of naval empire.

Thrasybulus largely faded from view for several years as Conon led the Athenian fleet to a series of victories, but in 392 BC Conon was imprisoned by the Persian satrap Tiribazus while attending a peace conference at Sardis; although released, he died in Cyprus without returning to Athens. Thrasybulus, leading the faction that sought to reject the peace offer, regained his position atop Athenian politics. In 389 BC, he led a force of triremes to levy tribute from cities around the Aegean and support Rhodes, where a democratic government was struggling against Sparta. On this campaign, Thrasybulus relaid much of the framework for an Athenian empire on 5th century BC model; he captured Byzantium, imposed a duty on ships passing through the Hellespont, and collected tribute from many of the islands of the Aegean. In 388 BC, as he led his fleet South through the Aegean, his soldiers ravaged the fields of Aspendus. In retaliation, the Aspendians raided the Athenian camp by night; Thrasybulus was killed in his tent.

The gains that Thrasybulus made on this campaign were soon reversed, however, by Persian intervention. Alarmed by the sudden reappearance of something resembling the Athenian empire that had driven them from the Aegean in the 5th century BC, the Persians began supporting Sparta, and a Persian fleet was soon in the Hellespont, threatening Athens's grain supply. Peace was quickly concluded, on the same terms that the Athenians had rejected in 392 BC; Thrasybulus's campaigns, though impressively successful in spreading Athenian influence, had little long-term effect, since they prompted Persia to force the Athenians to give up what they had gained.

== Historical opinions ==
Thrasybulus has been widely recognized as a successful military commander. Most of the major ancient historians assigned credit for the dramatic Athenian victories of 411 BC to Alcibiades, but a few, such as Cornelius Nepos, pointed to the decisive role that was played in these battles by Thrasybulus. More recent historians, such as Donald Kagan and R. J. Buck, have tended to support this analysis, pointing to the role that Thrasybulus played in crafting Athenian strategy in all these battles, and specifically to the decisive action he took at Cyzicus, which saved Alcibiades's force from being swamped, and turned a potential Athenian defeat into a stunning victory. R. J. Buck has suggested that Thrasybulus suffered from an "anti-democratic tradition of ancient historiography," which led many writers to minimize the accomplishments of one of democracy's strongest advocates.

Throughout his career, Thrasybulus defended democracy at Athens against its opponents. He was one of the few prominent citizens whom the Samians trusted to defend their democracy, and whom the fleet selected to lead it through the troubled time of conflict with the 400. Later, in his opposition to the Thirty Tyrants, Thrasybulus risked his life when few others would, and his actions were responsible for the quick restoration of democracy. In the words of Cornelius Nepos,

This most noble action, then, is entirely Thrasybulus's; for when the Thirty Tyrants, appointed by the Lacedaemonians, kept Athens oppressed in a state of slavery, and had partly banished from their country, and partly put to death, a great number of the citizens whom fortune had spared in the war, and had divided their confiscated property among themselves, he was not only the first, but the only man at the commencement, to declare war against them.

John Fine points to the clemency shown by Thrasybulus and other democrats in the wake of their victory over the Thirty as a key contribution towards reestablishing stable government in Athens. While many city-states throughout the Greek world broke down into vicious cycles of civil war and reprisal, Athens remained united and democratic, without interruption, until near the end of the 3rd century BC, and democracy, albeit interrupted several times by conquest or revolution, continued there until Roman times, several centuries later.

The second-century travel writer Pausanias called Thrasybulus "the greatest of all famous Athenians" for overthrowing the Thirty as well as his other exploits, making clear that he thought him greater than even Pericles.

Thus Thrasybulus won praise as an Athenian patriot and staunch, principled democrat. He has been criticized by modern historians, however, for failing to recognize that Athens in the 4th century BC could not sustain an imperial policy. R. J. Buck suggests that Thrasybulus, who came of age in the heady days when the democracy and empire under Pericles were at their fullest extent, never accepted that the devastating losses Athens had suffered in the Peloponnesian War made the return of those times impossible.

Buck compared him to Winston Churchill, another advocate of imperial policies who held fast to his beliefs after the tide of history had turned against him, and who rose to his peak of prominence at his country's darkest hour.
