= Battle of Piraeus =

Battle over the government of Athens in 403 BC

- Part of Phyle Campaign
- Map showing the three battles of the Phyle Campaign
Date	403 BC
Location	Piraeus, Athens
Result	Spartan victory

Belligerents
Athenian exiles	Sparta; Thirty Tyrants

Commanders and leaders
Thrasybulus	Pausanias

Casualties and losses
Over 180 killed	Unknown

The Battle of Piraeus was fought in 403 BC between Athenian exiles who had defeated the government of the Thirty Tyrants and occupied Piraeus and a Spartan force sent to combat them. In the battle, the Spartans narrowly defeated the exiles, with both sides suffering appreciable casualties. After the battle, Pausanias arranged a settlement between the two parties which allowed the reestablishment of democratic government in Athens.

== Prelude ==
In late 404 BC, a small force of Athenian exiles under the command of Thrasybulus entered Attica and seized the border strong point of Phyle. These exiles were seeking to dislodge the repressive oligarchic government of the Thirty Tyrants. In two battles, they defeated the forces of that government; after the second battle, the Thirty were deposed and replaced by a more moderate government, the Ten. These new rulers, although they ended the brutality that had marked the reign of the Thirty, were not ready to compromise with the exiles, who now held Piraeus, the port of Athens. Desultory skirmishing between the two sides continued during this stalemate, with the Athenian cavalry attacking foragers from Piraeus; meanwhile, the men in Piraeus began to make attacks on the walls of Athens.

Accordingly, both the Thirty at Eleusis and the Ten at Athens sent emissaries to Sparta, requesting assistance against the men in Piraeus. At this point, Spartan internal politics took a vital role in determining the future of Athens. Upon the arrival of the envoys, Lysander, who supported an aggressive foreign policy, and who had installed the Thirty in power in the first place, set out to Eleusis, where he began raising an army. After he left, however, the king Pausanias, who wished to pursue a more defensive foreign policy, succeeded in winning the support of three of the five ephors. He was dispatched at the head of an army to resolve the situation.

== Battle ==
Upon Pausanias's arrival in Attica, he ordered the men in Piraeus to disperse; when they refused to do so, he drew his men up to attack them, but did not actually engage them. The next day, however, a party of Athenian light troops attacked the Spartans while they were reconnoitering near Piraeus. Pausanias dispatched his cavalry and his youngest infantrymen to attack them, while he with the rest of the infantry followed in support. In pursuit, the Spartan cavalry and advance infantry entered Piraeus, where they encountered a large body of light troops, and were driven back with losses. Thrasybulus then came out with his hoplite force to press the issue; the Spartan hoplites engaged them, and, after a time, defeated them, inflicting 150 casualties. The men from Piraeus returned to the city, while Pausanias and his men returned to their camp. The war was over.

== Aftermath ==
After winning this victory, Pausanias, instead of pressing his advantage, sought to effect a reconciliation between the two Athenian parties. Accordingly, he persuaded both the men from Piraeus and the government in Athens to send emissaries to Sparta. These returned along with 15 officials empowered to work with Pausanias to negotiate a settlement to the issue. Pausanias then persuaded the Athenians to settle their disagreement on the terms of all being permitted to return to their homes except for the Thirty and their most prominent collaborators, while all who feared for their safety were free to remove to Eleusis. Democracy was reestablished, and all but the most egregious offenders were pardoned. Eleusis remained independent for a time, but, when it was revealed that the Thirty were gathering a mercenary army there, a preventive strike was launched and the town was reabsorbed into the Athenian state.
