= Mindarus =

5th-century BC Spartan admiral

Mindarus (Ancient Greek: Μίνδαρος) was a Spartan navarch who commanded the Peloponnesian fleet in 411 and 410 BC, during the Peloponnesian War. After successfully shifting the focus of the war to the Hellespont, he suffered a series of defeats. In the third and final defeat, he was killed, and the entire Peloponnesian fleet was either captured or destroyed.

== Relocation and early battles ==
Main articles: Battle of Cynossema, Battle of Abydos

Mindarus first took command of the fleet at Miletus, where the satrap Tissaphernes had promised the Spartans they would be joined by the sizeable Phoenician fleet under his command. After several months of waiting, Mindarus realized that no such fleet would be forthcoming, and made the strategic decision to relocate his fleet to the Hellespont, where the satrap Pharnabazus had promised him greater support than he was receiving from Tissaphernes.

Mindarus set out from Miletus with 73 ships; a storm forced him ashore at Chios, but he remained there only a few days. Sailing with haste to avoid an Athenian fleet that had been brought up from Samos to oppose him, he succeeded in bringing his fleet between Lesbos and the mainland and into the Hellespont, where he brushed aside a small Athenian fleet and joined the few allied ships in the region in the Spartan base at Abydos. With this strategic move, Mindarus had placed his fleet in position to cut off the Athenian grain supply, and had forced the Athenian fleet to challenge him on ground of his choosing.

From this point onwards, however, Mindarus' luck turned sour. Five days after his arrival at Abydos, the Athenians sailed into the narrow waters of the Hellespont to engage his numerically superior force. In the resulting battle, Peloponnesian victory appeared within grasp in the early going, as the Athenian left was cut off and the centre driven ashore on the promontory of Cynossema; superior seamanship on the part of the Athenian captains and sailors, however, turned the tide of the battle, and Mindarus' fleet fled back to Abydos with losses.

Mindarus summoned reinforcements to him at Abydos, but suffered a second defeat when a small group of ships sailing to join him there was trapped by the Athenian fleet; Mindarus sailed out to rescue them, but, after a hard fought battle, the arrival of Alcibiades with Athenian reinforcements turned the battle into a rout, with the Peloponnesians again suffering losses in their flight back to Abydos.

== Cyzicus ==
Over the next several months, Mindarus, with financial support from Pharnabazus, rebuilt his fleet to 80 triremes by the spring of 410 BC. Sailing eastward to Cyzicus, he besieged the city with the assistance of Pharnabazus' army and took it by storm. The Athenians pursued him, and, in the waters off Cyzicus, enticed Mindarus into a fatal trap. While Thrasybulus and Theramenes waited out of sight with a number of triremes, Alcibiades took forty ships and showed himself before Cyzicus. Mindarus took the bait, setting out with his entire fleet in pursuit. When he was sufficiently far from shore, the hidden Athenian forces emerged to cut off his line of retreat. Surrounded, Mindarus led his ships in a desperate flight towards a beach south-west of the city, the one direction open to him. Landing with Alcibiades' force hot on their heels, Mindarus' men, and Pharnabazus' troops who had come up to support them, fought to prevent the Athenians from towing their ships out to sea. Initially, the Athenians were driven back, but Thrasybulus and Theramenes, bringing up their forces and the Athenian land forces from the rear, were eventually able to drive the Persians off. Undaunted, Mindarus divided his force to face the threat now pressing from both sides, but when he fell in the fighting, Peloponnesian resistance dissolved; all the fleet's ships were either destroyed or captured.

In the wake of this resounding defeat, Mindarus' name was immortalized in one of the most famous examples of laconic brevity: a dispatch from the Spartan survivors was intercepted by the Athenians. It read: "The ships are lost. Mindarus is dead. The men are starving. We wonder what is to be done."
