= Battle of Cynossema =

Naval battle during the Second Peloponnesian War (411 BC)

Coordinates: 40°08′33″N 26°23′16″E

- Part of the Second Peloponnesian War
Date	411 BC
Location	Off Cynossema, in the Thracian Chersonese (modern-day Kilitbahir, Eceabat, Çanakkale, Turkey)
Result	Athenian victory

Belligerents
Athens and allies	Sparta and allies

Commanders and leaders
Thrasyllus, Thrasybulus	Mindarus

Strength
76 ships	86 ships

Casualties and losses
15 ships	21 ships
- Greece

The naval Battle of Cynossema (Ancient Greek: Κυνὸς σῆμα) took place in 411 BC during the Second Peloponnesian War. In the battle, an Athenian fleet commanded by Thrasybulus and Thrasyllus, although initially thrown on the defensive by a numerically superior Spartan fleet, won a narrow victory. This victory had an impact out of proportion to its tactical significance, coming when Athens' traditional democratic government had been replaced by an oligarchy and an Athenian defeat could have ended the war. The newly confident Athenian fleet proceeded to win two more victories in the Hellespont in quick succession, the second being the dramatic rout at Cyzicus, which ended the immediate Spartan threat to Athens' Black Sea lifeline.

== Prelude ==
In the wake of Athens' defeat in the Sicilian Expedition in 413, a small Spartan fleet commanded by Chalcideus, who was advised and assisted by Alcibiades, succeeded in bringing a number of critical Ionian cities into revolt from the Athenian Empire. After the revolt of the critical city of Miletus, the Persian satrap Tissaphernes concluded an alliance against Athens with Sparta. The Spartans remained unwilling to challenge the Athenians at sea, and an Athenian fleet succeeded in recapturing several cities and besieging Chios during the later months of 412 BC. In 411 BC, however, further rebellions at Rhodes and Euboea, and the capture of Abydos and Lampsacus on the Hellespont by a Peloponnesian army that had marched there overland, forced the Athenians to disperse their forces to meet these various threats. The Spartan fleet could now move freely in the Aegean, and took advantage of its newfound superiority by lifting the blockade of Chios and bottling up the Athenians' Aegean fleet at Samos.

By withdrawing their ships from the Hellespont to Samos, the Athenians were able to reestablish their naval superiority in the Aegean, but in doing so they opened the door for Sparta to shift the theater of war. Accordingly, in late July, the Spartan commander Clearchus made an attempt to slip 40 ships past the Athenian fleet to the Hellespont. These were turned back by a storm, but shortly afterwards 10 ships under the Megarian general Helixus reached the Hellespont, where they triggered revolts in Byzantium, Chalcedon and other important cities. Several months later, the new Spartan navarch Mindarus, deciding that the promises of support made by Pharnabazus, the Persian satrap of Hellespontine Phrygia, were more promising than those of Tissaphernes in Ionia, slipped his entire fleet past the Athenians. He joined up with the Peloponnesian ships already operating in the Hellespont and established his base at Abydos, forcing the small Athenian fleet at Sestos to flee, with losses, to Imbros and Lemnos.

== Battle ==
With a substantial Peloponnesian fleet operating in the Hellespont, the crucial trade route through which Athens' grain supply passed, the Athenian fleet had little choice but to pursue Mindarus. Accordingly, Thrasybulus, assuming overall command, led the fleet to Elaeus on the tip of the Gallipoli peninsula, where the Athenians spent five days preparing to challenge the 86 Spartan ships at Abydos with their 76 ships. The Athenian fleet sailed in column into the Hellespont, following the northern shore, while the Spartans put out from Abydos on the southern shore. When the Athenian left had rounded the point of Cynossema, the Spartans attacked, planning to outflank the Athenian right and trap the fleet in the Hellespont while driving the center aground on Cynossema. The Athenian center was quickly driven aground, and the left under Thrasyllus, beset by Syracusan ships and unable to see the rest of the fleet around the sharp point, was unable to come to its aid. Thrasybulus on the right, meanwhile, was able to avoid encirclement by extending his line westward, but in doing so lost touch with the center. With the Athenians divided and a substantial portion of their fleet incapacitated, a Spartan victory seemed assured.

At this critical juncture, however, the Peloponnesian line began to fall into disorder as ships broke line to pursue individual Athenian vessels. Seeing this, Thrasybulus turned his ships abruptly and attacked the Spartan left. After routing these ships, the Athenian right bore down on the Peloponnesian center, and, catching them in a state of disorganization, quickly routed them as well. The Syracusans on the right, seeing the rest of their fleet in flight, abandoned their attack on the Athenian left and fled as well. The narrowness of the straits, which ensured that the Peloponnesians had only a short way to go to safety, limited the damage the Athenians could inflict, but by day's end they had captured 21 Spartan ships to the 15 of theirs that the Spartans had taken in the early fighting. The Athenians set up a trophy on Cynossema and put in at Sestos, while the Peloponnesians made their way back to Abydos.

== Aftermath ==
In the days after the battle, the Athenians refitted their ships at Sestos and dispatched a small detachment to Cyzicus, recapturing that town and seizing 8 triremes encountered along the way. A trireme was dispatched to Athens, where the unexpected good news restored the people's confidence in the war effort. Historian Donald Kagan has emphasized the effect this victory had on the Athenians. Forced to fight on terms chosen by their enemies, at a time when the city lacked the resources to build another fleet, the Athenians could have lost the war on that day at Cynossema. Instead, they won a victory that allowed them to continue fighting, with victory still seeming possible.

== Sources ==
- Kagan, Donald. The Peloponnesian War (Penguin Books, 2003). ISBN 0-670-03211-5
- Thucydides. History of the Peloponnesian War . Translated by Richard Crawley – via Wikisource.
