= Battle of Nemea =

Land battle during the Corinthian War (394 BC)

- Part of the Corinthian War
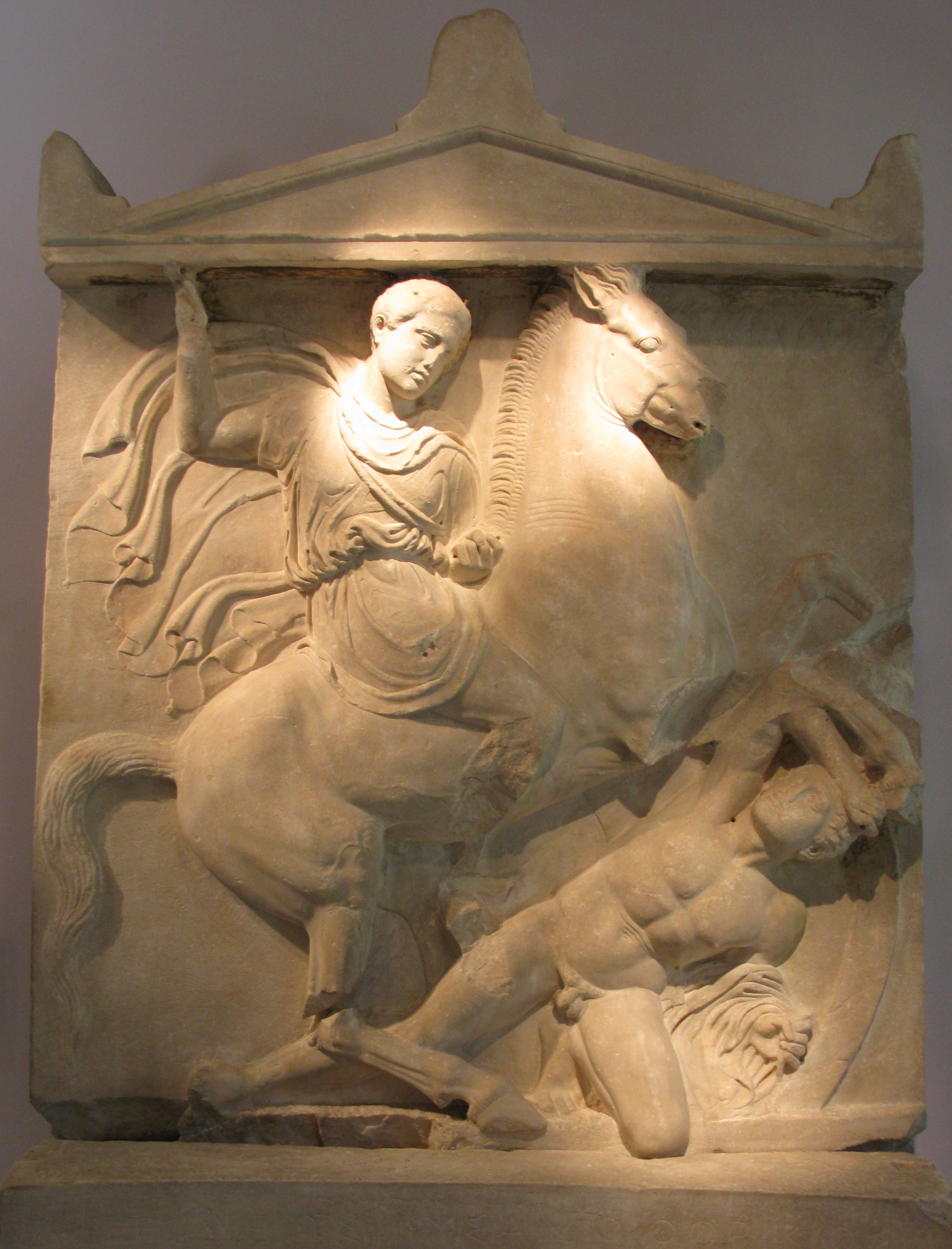
- The Athenian cavalryman Dexileos fighting an hoplite. Dexileos was killed in action near Corinth in the summer of 394 BC during the Corinthian War. Dexileos probably died in the Battle of Nemea itself, or in a proximate engagement. Grave Stele of Dexileos, early 4th century BC.
| Date | 394 BC |
| Location | Nemea, Peloponnese, present-day Greece 37.8089°N 22.7103°E |
| Result | Spartan victory |

Belligerents
| Sparta; Peloponnesian League | Thebes; Argos; Athens; Corinth |

Commanders and leaders
| Aristodemus | Thrasybulus (Athenian contingent) |

Strength
| 18,000–19,000 hoplites 600 cavalrymen 300 archers 400 slingers | 24,000 hoplites; 6,000 Athenian; 7,000 Argives; 5,000 Boeotians; 3,000 Corinthians; 3,000 Euboeans; 1,550 cavalrymen; 600 Athenians; 800 Boeotians; 100 from Chalcis; 50 Locrians |

Casualties and losses
| 1,100 dead or wounded | 2,800 dead or wounded |
- Location of the Battle of Nemea

The Battle of Nemea of 394 BC, also known in ancient Athens as the Battle of Corinth, was a battle in the Corinthian War, between Sparta and the coalition of Argos, Athens, Corinth, and Thebes. The battle was fought in Corinthian territory, at the dry bed of the Nemea River. The battle was a decisive Spartan victory, which, coupled with the Battle of Coronea later in the same year, gave Sparta the advantage in the early fighting on the Greek mainland.

== Prelude ==
Hostilities in the Corinthian War began in 395 BC with raiding in northwestern Greece, eventually leading to a clash between Sparta and Thebes at the Battle of Haliartus, a Theban victory. In the wake of this battle, Athens, Thebes, Corinth, and Argos joined together to form an anti-Spartan alliance, with its forces commanded by a council at Corinth.

In 394 BC, the council gathered together its forces at Corinth. A Spartan army under Aristodemus, the guardian of the boy king Agesipolis, was sent north from Sparta to challenge the allies. The allied army, meanwhile, waited at Corinth, while the council debated over who should command it. Before a decision was reached, the Spartan army entered Corinthian territory, burning and plundering along the way. The allies marched out to meet the Spartans, and the two armies met each other near the dry bed of the Nemea river.

== The battle ==
The Spartan army was composed of some 18,000–19,000 hoplites, with associated light troops. Of the hoplites, 6,000 were Spartan, with the remainder coming from the other states of the Peloponnesian League: 3,000 from the Eleans, Triphylians, Acrorians, and Lasionians; 1,500 from Sicyon; and at least 3,000 from Epidaurus, Troezen, Hermione, and Halieis. There was also a cavalry force of about 600, about 300 Cretan archers, and at least 400 Marganian, Letrinian, and Amphidolian slingers.

Opposing the Spartans, the allied side consisted of about 24,000 hoplites, with associated light troops. Thebes, Athens, and Argos each provided about one quarter of the allied hoplites: 6,000 hoplites from Athens under Thrasybulus, about 7,000 from Argos, 5,000 from the Boeotians, 3,000 from Corinth, and 3,000 from Euboea. Of the allied cavalry, 800 were Boeotian, 600 were Athenian, about 100 from Chalcis in Euboea, and about 50 from the Ozolian Locrians.

The Spartans and their allies lined up for battle with the Spartans on the right and the allies on the left. The opposing coalition was divided over how to arrange themselves; the Athenians wanted to line up on the right, but ultimately had acceded to the demand of the Boeotians that they take the left, while the Boeotians took the right. This meant that the Athenians were opposite the Spartans, while the Boeotians and other allies faced the Spartans' allies.

As the two phalanxes closed for battle, both shifted to the right (this was a common occurrence in hoplite battles—hoplites carried their shield on their left arm, so men would shift to the right to gain the protection of their neighbor's shield as well as their own). This shift meant that, by the time the armies met, both of them extended past their opponents' left flank. Consequently, the right flanks of both armies were victorious, while the left flanks of both were defeated.

The Spartans then turned from their defeat of the Athenians to face the soldiers from the allied right wing who had rashly pursued the Spartans' allies. The Spartan phalanx took first the Argives, then the Corinthians, and then the Boeotians in the side, inflicting heavy losses on all three. According to Diodoros of Sicily, Sparta and its allies had inflicted 2,800 casualties, while suffering only 1,100. Xenophon tells that the Spartans only lost 8 men. This last number seems unrealistic, but he could just be mentioning the Spartiates that died in the battle, since the Spartiates themselves only made up a fraction of the Spartan army (the bulk being Perioikoi, armed helots and allies).

The main source of the battle is the pro-Spartan historian Xenophon, who put most of the blame of the allies' defeat on the arrogance and indiscipline of the Thebans.

== Aftermath ==
Although the Spartans held the field at the end of the battle, they were unable to force their way past Corinth and enter central Greece. Accordingly, they returned home. The allied army, after several months of inactivity, saw action in a second major battle at Coronea later in the same year. These two battles marked the only traditional large-scale land fighting that would take place in the war, which lasted until 386 BC.

== See also ==
- Spartan hegemony

== Bibliography ==
- D. M. Lewis, John Boardman, Simon Hornblower, M. Ostwald (editors), The Cambridge Ancient History, volume VI: The Fourth Century B. C., Cambridge University Press, 1994.
- Pritchett, W. Kendrick (1965). Studies in ancient Greek topography. Berkeley: University of California Press. ISBN 0-520-09635-5. OCLC 408298.
- Fine, John V.A. The Ancient Greeks: A critical history (Harvard University Press, 1983) ISBN 0-674-03314-0
- Diodorus Siculus, Library
- Xenophon (1890s) [original 4th century BC]. Hellenica . Translated by Henry Graham Dakyns – via Wikisource.
- Buck, R. J. (1998). Thrasybulus and the Athenian Democracy: the Life of an Athenian Statesman. Historia Einzelschriften. Vol. 120. Stuttgart: Franz Steiner. ISBN 3-515-07221-7.
