= Elean War =

War between Sparta and Elis

- Part of the Spartan hegemony
Date	402–400 BC or 401–399 BC or 400–398 BC
Location	Peloponnesus, Greece
Result	Spartan victory

Belligerents
Sparta	Elis

Commanders and leaders
Agis II; Pausanias; Lysippus	Thrasydaeus

The Elean or Eleian War (c. 400 BC) was a conflict between the Greek city-states of Sparta and Elis.

== Background ==
Sparta and Elis had been allies against Athens during the early Peloponnesian War, but relations between them soured after Elis refused to endorse the Peace of Nicias in 421 BC. In 420, the Eleans, claiming that Sparta violated a truce brought about by the Olympic Games, barred their erstwhile ally from participating in them, and flogged a Spartan who tried to do so anyway. Later, in 418, Elis joined the coalition of Peloponnesian city-states (alongside Argos and Mantineia) which attacked Sparta at the behest of Athens, only to suffer defeat at the Battle of Mantineia. After the Peloponnesian War was concluded, the Spartans, seeking to punish their former allies, demanded that they grant independence to the allied cities surrounding Elis, with the aim of breaking Elean military power.

== Course ==
The war began in 402, 401 or 400 BC when the Spartan king Agis led an invasion of Eleia from the northeast through Achaea, along the river Larissus. The Spartans began laying waste to enemy country, but soon witnessed an earthquake, which the King, according to Xenophon, interpreted as a bad omen, prompting him to call off the invasion and disband his army. The Spartans may in fact have reached as far as Olympia, and suffered a defeat there at the sacred Olympian precinct of Altis. (Note: A somewhat confused report of an Elean victory over the Spartans at Altis is given by Pausanias. Bourke suggests that the pro-Spartan Xenophon may have deliberately omitted mention of a Spartan defeat and ascribed Agis's retreat to the earthquake alone, though other authors have questioned whether Pausanias's account here should be fully trusted. Unz suggests that the abortive invasion may have been simply a show of force.) Agis's retreat emboldened the Eleans to send embassies to all Greek states hostile to Sparta, urging opposition to Sparta's foreign policy.

At the urging of the ephors, Agis led a second invasion, probably in the summer of the following year, (Note: Xenophon's description of events has led to confusion about the exact timespan between Agis's two campaigns. Buckler argues that the first and second campaigns happened in the same year, while Unz, Roy, and Bourke believe that they happened in different summers.) and all of Sparta's allies were called upon to contribute soldiers. Athens duly sent a contingent, but conspicuous in their refusal were the dissatisfied Corinthians and Boeotians. Agis invaded from the south through Messenia, marching alongside the Pamisus river and then through the defile of Aulon (north of modern Kyparissia), before crossing the Neda. The Lepreans, Macistians, and Epitalians revolted from Elis and joined the invading Spartans, as did Letrini, Amphidolis, and Margana after Agis crossed the Alpheus. From there the King continued east towards Olympia, where he sacrificed to Zeus unopposed, and thence proceeded northwards, probably through the coastline, towards the city of Elis itself, ravaging the country as he went. During their march, the Spartans were joined by volunteers from Arcadia and Achaea, eager for a share of the plunder. Although Elis was unwalled, Agis made no attempt to take the city, and, after inflicting some damage to its suburbs and gymnasia, moved towards the Elean harbor of Cyllene, whose surroundings he also pillaged.

At this juncture, a wealthy citizen of Elis, Xenias, who was an agent (proxenos) of Sparta inside the city as well as a personal friend of Agis, attempted to stage a pro-Spartan oligarchic coup, instigating a slaughter and killing a man who resembled the democratic leader Thrasydaeus. Xenias's partisans then gathered in the agora, but it was soon discovered that Thrasydaeus was in fact alive, asleep somewhere else after becoming drunk, and his supporters immediately swarmed to his protection. Thrasydaeus then successfully drove Xenias and his partisans out of the city, and they in turn fled to the Spartan camp. (Note: Unz suggests that Agis may have expected a friendly coup attempt, and chosen to move away from Elis towards Cyllene at this moment accordingly. Buckler writes that while Agis probably knew of political tensions within Elis, Xenias's unsuccessful assassination attempt speaks against the possibility that he and the Spartans planned it jointly ahead of time.) Before returning to Laconia and disbanding his army, the Spartan king Agis left a garrison at Epitalium, with one Lysippus as the harmost (military governor), and the Elean exiles under their care. For the remainder of the summer and the ensuing winter, Lysippus plundered the Elean countryside, together with the Lepreans.

A third Spartan expedition, this time under their other king, Pausanias, met a minor defeat outside the walls of Elis against some Aetolian mercenaries, but the Eleians, seeing that prolonged resistance was futile, surrendered.
