= Hypana =

Town in the interior of Triphylia in ancient Elis

Coordinates: 37°32′26″N 21°45′11″E

Hypana (Ancient Greek: Ὕπανα) or Hypaneia (Ὑπάνεια) was a town in the interior of Triphylia in ancient Elis. It was taken by Philip V of Macedon in the Social War. Its inhabitants had been transferred to Elis when Strabo wrote. Hypana is mentioned along with Typaneae near the rivers Dalion and Acheron, tributaries of Alpheus. Both these towns must have been situated in the mountains of Triphylia.

Most modern scholars identify its location with a site near the modern town of Platiana, though other writers disagree, and propose other locations.
