= Opus (Elis) =

Town in ancient Elis

Opus (Ancient Greek: Ὀποῦς) was a town in the mountainous district of Acroreia in ancient Elis, taken by the Spartans, when they invaded Elis at the close of the Peloponnesian War. Diodorus Siculus writes that the Spartans, under command of Pausanias of Sparta, marched against Elis with 4,000 men in 402 BCE, and that Opus (along with Alium, Eupagium, Thraustus, and Lasion) was one of the towns subdued. Xenophon mentions an Arcadian raid into Elis and took several towns of Acroreia around 365 BCE. Strabo says that the inhabitants of Opus were related to those of the Locrian Opus. The Scholiast on Pindar mentions a river Opus in Elis.

Its site has not been located, also some suggest it may be the ruins near modern Gartsiko.
