= Chaas (Elis) =

Town of Triphylia, in ancient Elis

Chaas (Ancient Greek: Χάας) was a town of Triphylia, in ancient Elis, nor far from Lepreum on the Akidas. Strabo comments that some people believed that Chaas was the location of the war between Pylos and the Arcadians, as told by Homer.

It is unlocated.
