= Pyrgus (Triphylia) =

Town of Triphylia in ancient Elis

Coordinates: 37°24′42″N 21°41′30″E

Pyrgus or Pyrgos (Ancient Greek: Πύργος) or Pyrgi or Pyrgoi (Πύργοι) was the most southerly town of Triphylia in ancient Elis, at the mouth of the river Neda, upon the Messenian frontier, and hence described by Stephanus of Byzantium as a Messenian town. It is one of the six cities (along with Lepreum, Phrixae, Macistus, Epium, and Nudium) founded by the Minyans in the territory of the Paroreatae and Caucones. Herodotus comments that, in his time, most of the cities founded by the Minyans were ravaged by the Eleans. It is supposed that this happened around 460 BCE, after the Third Messenian War. Polybius reports that it was among the towns of Triphylia that decided to ally with Philip V of Macedon in the Social War (219 BCE), after he took Samicum.

Its site is located at Agios Elias near modern Pyrgos, Elis, although other locations have been proposed.
