= Nudium =

Ancient city

Nudium or Noudion (Ancient Greek: Νούδιον) was one of the six cities (along with Lepreum, Phrixae, Pyrgus, Epium, and Macistus) founded by the Minyans in the territory of the Paroreatae and Caucones, in Triphylia in ancient Elis, but which was destroyed by the Eleians in the time of Herodotus.

It is unlocated.
