= Typaneae =

Town of Triphylia in ancient Elis

Coordinates: 37°30′32″N 21°48′22″E

Typaniai

Typaneae or Typaniai (Ancient Greek: Τυπανέαι, Τυμπανέαι, or Τυμπάνεια), also Latinized as Tympaneae, was a town of Triphylia in ancient Elis, a possible successor settlement to Homeric Aepy. It is mentioned by Strabo along with Hypana near the rivers Dalion and Acheron, tributaries of Alpheus. It was taken by Philip V of Macedon in the Social War. It was situated in the mountains in the interior of the country.

Its site has been located near modern Vresto, though other writers disagree and propose other locations.
