= Thraustus =

Town in the district of Acroreia in ancient Elis

Thraustus or Thraustos (Ancient Greek: Θραύστος) or Thraestus or Thraistos (Θραιστός) was a town in the mountainous district of Acroreia in ancient Elis. Diodorus Siculus writes that the Spartans, under command of Pausanias of Sparta, marched against Elis with 4,000 men in 402 BCE, and that the towns of Opus, Alium, Eupagium, Thraustus, and Lasion were subdued. Xenophon mentions an Arcadian raid into Elis and took several towns of Acroreia around 365 BCE.

Its site is unlocated.
