= Phrixa =

Town of Triphylia in ancient Elis

Coordinates: 37°38′06″N 21°42′41″E

Phrixa (Ancient Greek: Φρίξα) or Phrixae or Phrixai (Φρίξαι) was a town of Triphylia in ancient Elis, situated upon the left bank of the Alpheius, at the distance of 30 stadia from Olympia. It is one of the six cities (along with Lepreum, Macistus, Pyrgus, Epium, and Nudium) founded by the Minyans in the territory of the Paroreatae and Caucones. Its name was derived from Phaestus.

Phrixa is rarely mentioned in history; but it shared the fate of the other Triphylian cities. It is cited by Xenophon in the war between Elis and Sparta and its allies led by Agis II about the year 400 BCE. After the end of the hostilities, Elis was forced to lose control of, among others, the city of Phrixa. It is also mentioned by Polybius; in the year 218 BCE, Philip V of Macedon took several cities of Elis among which was Phrixa.

Its position is determined by Pausanias, who says that it was situated upon a pointed hill, opposite the Leucanias, a tributary of the Alpheius, and at a ford of the latter river. This pointed hill is now called Paleofánaro, and is a conspicuous object from both sides of the river, whence the city received the name of Phaestus or Phaistos (Φαιστός) in later times. The city was in ruins in the time of Pausanias, who mentions there a temple of Athena Cydonia. Upon the summit of the hill, in the 19th century when visited by archaeologists, there were still remains of Hellenic walls.

The location of Phrixa is at modern Phixa.
