= Caucon =

Greek mythology - of the same name

In Greek mythology, the name Caucon (/ˈkɔːkən, ˈkɔːkɒn/; Ancient Greek: Καύκων, romanized: Kaukōn) may refer to:

- Caucon, an Arcadian prince as one of the 50 sons of the impious King Lycaon either by the naiad Cyllene, Nonacris or by unknown woman. He was an ancestral hero and eponym of the Caucones that were believed to have settled in Triphylia. His tomb was shown at Lepreus, with a statue of a man with a lyre standing over it. Other traditions made him son of Poseidon and father of Lepreus by Astydameia. Caucon and his brothers were the most nefarious and carefree of all people. To test them, Zeus visited them in the form of a peasant. These brothers mixed the entrails of a child into the god's meal, whereupon the enraged Zeus threw the meal over the table. Caucon was killed, along with his brothers and their father, by a lightning bolt of the god.
- Caucon, son of Celaenus and grandson of the autochthon Phlyus, from Eleusis. He was said to have brought the rites of the Great Goddesses from Eleusis to Andania in Messene. Legend had it that he appeared to Epaminondas in a dream, prophesying him success in restoration of the Messenian state; the Messenian allies of Epaminondas offered sacrifices to Caucon.
