= Letrini =

Town of Pisatis in ancient Elis

Coordinates: 37°40′22″N 21°25′53″E

Letrini or Letrinoi (Ancient Greek: Λέτρινοι) or Letrina (Λετρίνα) was a town of Pisatis in ancient Elis, situated near the sea, upon the Sacred Way leading from Elis to Olympia, at the distance of 180 stadia from Elis, and 120 from Olympia.

According to Greek mythology, it was said to have been founded by Letreus, a son of Pelops. There was a tradition that said that the bones of Pelops - necessary, according to the oracle, for the Achaeans to conquer Troy - were at Letrini.

Together with several of the other dependent townships of Elis, it joined Spartan king Agis II, when he invaded the territories of Elis; and the Eleians were obliged to surrender their supremacy over Letrini by the peace which they concluded with the Spartans in 400 BCE. Later, the townsmen of Letrini formed part of the Spartan army that fought at the Battle of Nemea in 394 BCE. Xenophon speaks of Letrini, Amphidoli, and Marganeis as Triphylian places, although they were on the right bank of the Alpheius; and if there is no corruption in the text, the word Triphylian must be used in a loose sense to signify the dependent townships of Elis. The Λετριναῖαι γύαι are mentioned by Lycophron. In the time of Pausanias nothing remained of Letrini except a few houses and a temple of Artemis Alpheiaea; the epithet Alpheiaea was due to a tradition that the river god Alpheus fell in love with Artemis and tried to seduce her in the vicinity of Letrini. It remains doubtful whether this temple is the same as that mentioned by Strabo as located near the mouth of the Alpheius.

Letrini may be placed at the village and monastery of Agios Ioannis (St John), between Pyrgos and the port of Katakolo, where, according to William Martin Leake, among many fragments of antiquity, a part of a large statue was found in the early 19th century. Some modern scholars accept the identification, while others treat it as tentative.
