= Thryon =

Town in Triphylia in ancient Elis

Thyron (Ancient Greek: Θρύον), sometimes Latinized as Thryum, or Thryoessa (Θρυόεσσα) was a town in Triphylia in ancient Elis, mentioned by Homer in the Catalogue of Ships of the Iliad, where the town is noted to be in the dominions of Nestor. The town is also noted in the Homeric Hymn to Apollo. Later in the Iliad, the poet describes Thyron was at the ford of the river Alpheius. In the same passage, Homer calls the town Thryoessa, places it upon a lofty hill, and relates how it withstood a siege by the Epeii during their war against the Eleans. Strabo identified Thyron with the later Epitalium or strefi ; but the identity is uncertain.
