= Epeium =

Town of Triphylia in ancient Elis

Coordinates: 37°33′57″N 21°47′05″E

Epeium or Epeion (Ancient Greek: Ἤπειον or Ήπειον) or Epium or Epion (Ἔπιον or Ήπιον) or Aepion or Aipion (Αἰπίον or Αἴπιον) was a town of Triphylia in ancient Elis, which stood between Makistos and Heraea, and may have been the successor settlement to Homeric Aepy. It is one of the six cities (along with Lepreum, Macistus, Phrixae, Pyrgus, and Nudium) founded by the Minyans in the territory of Paroreatae and Caucones.

At the beginning of the 5th century BCE, it was a community of perioeci of Elis. According to Xenophon, the Eleans claimed that they had bought the town from its owners for 30 talents; the identity of these "owners" is unknown. Xenophon's phrase suggests that at the time of the sale, Epeium was not controlled by its original population. It has been suggested that it belonged to the Arcadians.

Towards the year 400 BCE, Epeium was liberated from the Elean government and made autonomous. It probably joined the Triphylian federation. In 369 BCE, it was a member of the Arcadian League.

The site is tentatively located near modern Tripiti (formerly called Bitsibardi). Archaeologists have discovered the foundations of an old structure, a retaining wall and many tiles. The first researchers found walls of ashlar, ceramics of the Classical Period, and blocks and drums of columns. The acropolis occupies an area of 150 x 25 m (500 x 80 ft).
