= Acheron (disambiguation) =

Acheron is a river in the Epirus region of Greece, believed in ancient Greek mythology to branch into the underworld.

Acheron may also refer to:

== Places ==
- Acheron, Victoria, a town in Australia
- Acheron (Elis), a river in the Peloponnese, Greece
- Acheron Island, an island off Queensland, Australia
- Acheron River (Victoria), Australia
- Acheron River (Marlborough), New Zealand
- Acheron River (Canterbury), New Zealand

== Fiction ==
- Acheron (Dungeons & Dragons), an Outer Plane in Dungeons & Dragons cosmology
- A main character of the webcomic Inverloch
- A powerful ghost in DC Comics that temporarily joins the Shadowpact
- The Acheron, a fictional 19th-century French warship in the motion picture Master and Commander: The Far Side of the World
- Acheron (LV-426), the planet-like moon where the film Alien and its sequel are primarily set
- Acheron Parthenopaeus, a character in the Dark-Hunter series of romance books
- "Acheron: Part 1" and "Acheron: Part 2", a two-part episode from the television series The Walking Dead
- Acheron (Honkai: Star Rail), a playable character in Honkai: Star Rail

== Other uses ==
- Acheron (band), a Florida death metal band
- HMS Acheron, the name of several ships of the Royal Navy
- Acheron-class torpedo boat, a torpedo boat of the New South Wales Naval Brigade
- French submarine Achéron (Q150), a French Navy submarine commissioned in 1932 and scuttled in 1942
- Acheron language, a language of Sudan
- The earlier name for Abramelin, a Melbourne death metal band
- "Acheron/Unearthing the Orb", a song by the Sword from the album Warp Riders
- LARP6 or La-related protein 6, a human protein sometimes referred to as 'Acheron'
