= Aipy =

Aipy or Aepy (Ancient Greek: Αἶπυ) was a city in ancient Elis, Greece. It was one of the oldest towns in Elis, mentioned by Homer in the Catalogue of Ships in Iliad, as one of the territories ruled by Nestor. Homer uses the expression "ἐΰκτιτον Αίπυ" (ἐΰκτιτον means "well-built" and Αίπυ, the town's name, means "steep"). It is also quoted in the Homeric Hymn to Apollo. There are those who believe that the name corresponds to the toponym A-pu2 cited in tablets in Linear B.

Its location was a mystery, which has occupied minds since at least the time of Strabo, who commented it could be considered that Aipy should be identified with a city called Margana or with a natural bastion located near Makistos. It may the same as the later Epeium, a town of Triphylia, which was located on a mountain, between Macistus and Heraea. The site of Epeium is tentatively identified with a site near Tripiti. Others suggest that Aipy was the later Typaneae, and locate its site between the present villages Platiana and Makistos (both in the municipal unit of Skillounta), where a wall of the ancient acropolis survives into the present, together with a theatre and an agora (market), now entirely in ruins. The latest research, however, locate it at Iklaina 10 km south of the Palace of Nestor, which was subdued around 1250 BC, probably by the ruler of Pylos.
