= First Olynthian War =

Conflict between Sparta and the Chalcidian League (382–379 BC)

- Part of the Spartan hegemony
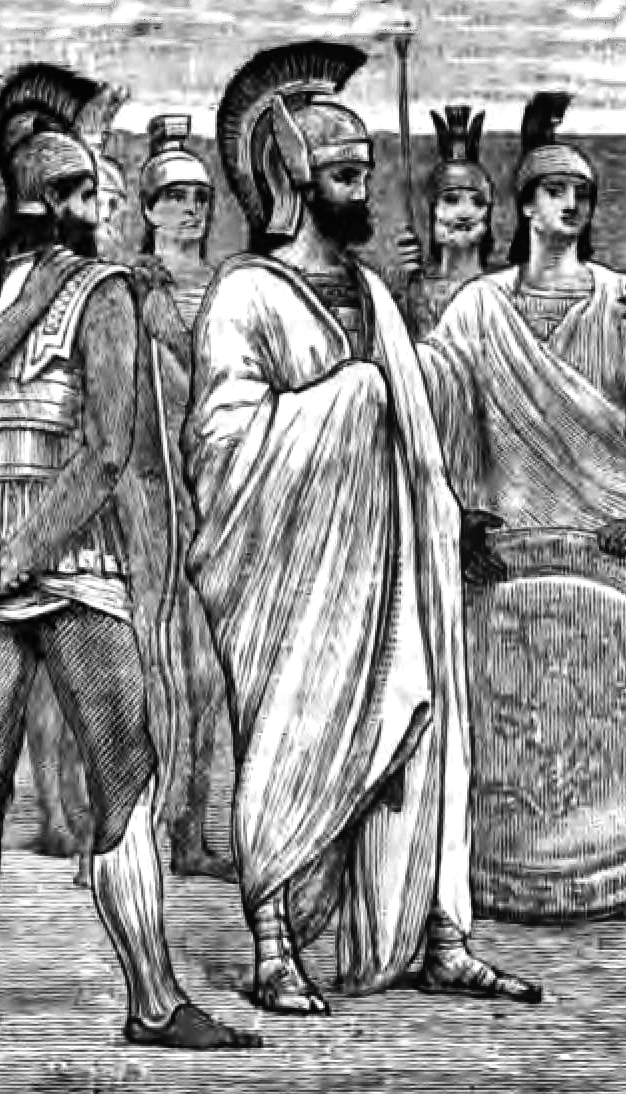
- Spartan King Agesilaus II
Date	382–379 BC
Location	Central Macedonia, Chalkidiki
Result	Spartan victory

Belligerents
Peloponnesian League; Macedonia	Chalcidian League

Commanders and leaders
Agesilaus II	Unknown

Strength
Unknown	Unknown

Casualties and losses
Unknown	Unknown

The First Olynthian War (382-379 BC) involved Sparta, Macedonia and their allies in conflict with the cities of the Chalcidian League, led by Olynthus. The reasons were, firstly, the strengthening of the Chalcidian League led by Olynthus, which created a threat to Macedonia, and secondly, the desire of Sparta to establish its dominance in Northern Greece.

== Background ==
In 393/392 BC. Macedonia was invaded by the Illyrians, who defeated Amyntas III and drove him out of the country. Trying to enlist the help of Olynthus, Amyntas transferred part of his border territories to Olynthus. However, there is no evidence that Olynthus provided Amyntas with any assistance. Amyntas is believed to have fled from Macedonia to Thessaly, where he had supporters who soon helped him return to the throne.

Some time later (probably c. 391 BC), a 50-year treaty was concluded between Macedonia and the Chalcidian League. Part of the text of this treaty was found on a stone at Olynthus. There is talk of a military alliance, and rules are established for the export of timber, a strategic raw material, the export of which was previously under the control of Macedonia. From then on, the Chalcidians were allowed to freely export resin and wood to build ships. Only to export spruce was it necessary to obtain permission from the king and pay duties. In the political part of the agreement, the parties agreed not to conclude, except by common consent, treaties of friendship with Amphipolis, Akanthos and Bottieya.

The main points of the treaty were in the interests of Olynthus, who, in addition to greater trade privileges, achieved the isolation of its rivals in the region. Over the next few years, the economic and political position of the Chalcidian League continued to strengthen, while Macedonia remained very vulnerable.

In the mid-380s BC the Illyrians again intensified their pressure on their neighbours. In 385/4 BC, at the instigation of the Syracusan tyrant Dionysius the Elder, they attacked Epirus to restore the exiled king Alcetes to the throne. About 15,000 Molossians died in the battle, but then the Spartans sent an army to Epirus to drive out the Molossians.

Based on Diodorus, it is assumed that the Illyrians in 383/2 BC launched a new invasion of Macedonia, and this prompted King Amyntas to make additional concessions to the Chalcidians. However, it is more likely that Diodorus simply repeated the report of the 393/2 BC invasion.

However, Macedonia was still weakened, and when Amyntas asked for the return of the lands ceded to the Chalcidians, his request was refused. Moreover, according to Xenophon, Olynthos continued his expansion, “taking possession of many other Macedonian cities, including even Pella, the largest city in Macedonia”. As a result Amyntas's domain was reduced to the borders of the ancestral domain of the Argead dynasty - the region of Pieria around Aegae.

== Embassies to Sparta ==
Amyntas decided to turn for help to the strongest Greek power, Sparta, which, after the conclusion of the Peace of Antalcidas, had a free hand for active action in Greece. The cities of Apollonia and Akanthos, which the Olynthians forced to join the Chalcidian League, also turned to Sparta with requests for help against Olynthus. The ambassadors of these cities emphasised that Olynthus was negotiating with the enemies of the Lacedaemonians, the Athenians and Thebans, and if measures were not taken, then the Spartans could soon face a powerful coalition.

== Start of war ==
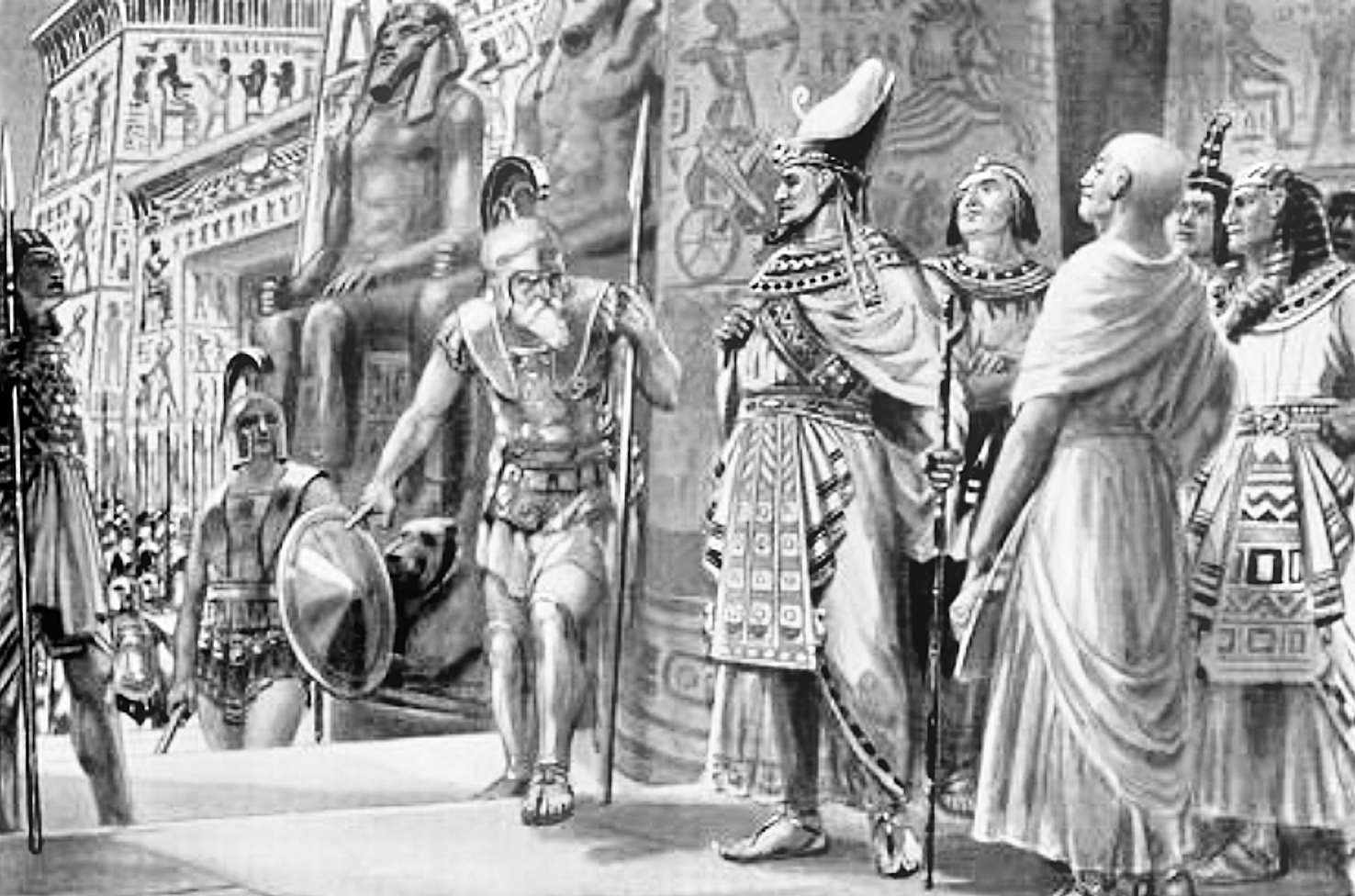
Agesilas (centre)

The Spartans decided to equip 10,000 troops against the Chalcidian army. Since it took time to gather these forces, in the spring of 382 BC 2,000 men were sent to Chalkidiki including a detachment of Spartan neodamodes and perioeci under the command of Eudamidas. Arriving at the place, Eudamidas placed garrisons in the cities that asked for it, occupied Potidea (recently included in the Chalcidian League), and established his base there. He had few troops for offensive operations, so the Spartan commander limited himself to the defence of the possessions of the allies.

The Thebans did not dare to oppose Sparta, but took a hostile position, forbidding their citizens to participate in the campaign against Olynthus.

In the summer of 382 BC, the Spartans sent reinforcements to Eudamidas under the command of his brother Phoebidas. The Spartans, passing by Thebes, supported the oligarchic coup that brought the pro-Spartan party to power in the city by providing a Spartan garrison for the city.

The Spartans then sent the rest of the army to Chalcidice, led by harmost Teleutius, brother of king Agesilaus II. This army was joined by contingents from the allied cities. Thebes also provided hoplites and cavalry.

== First battle of Olynthus ==
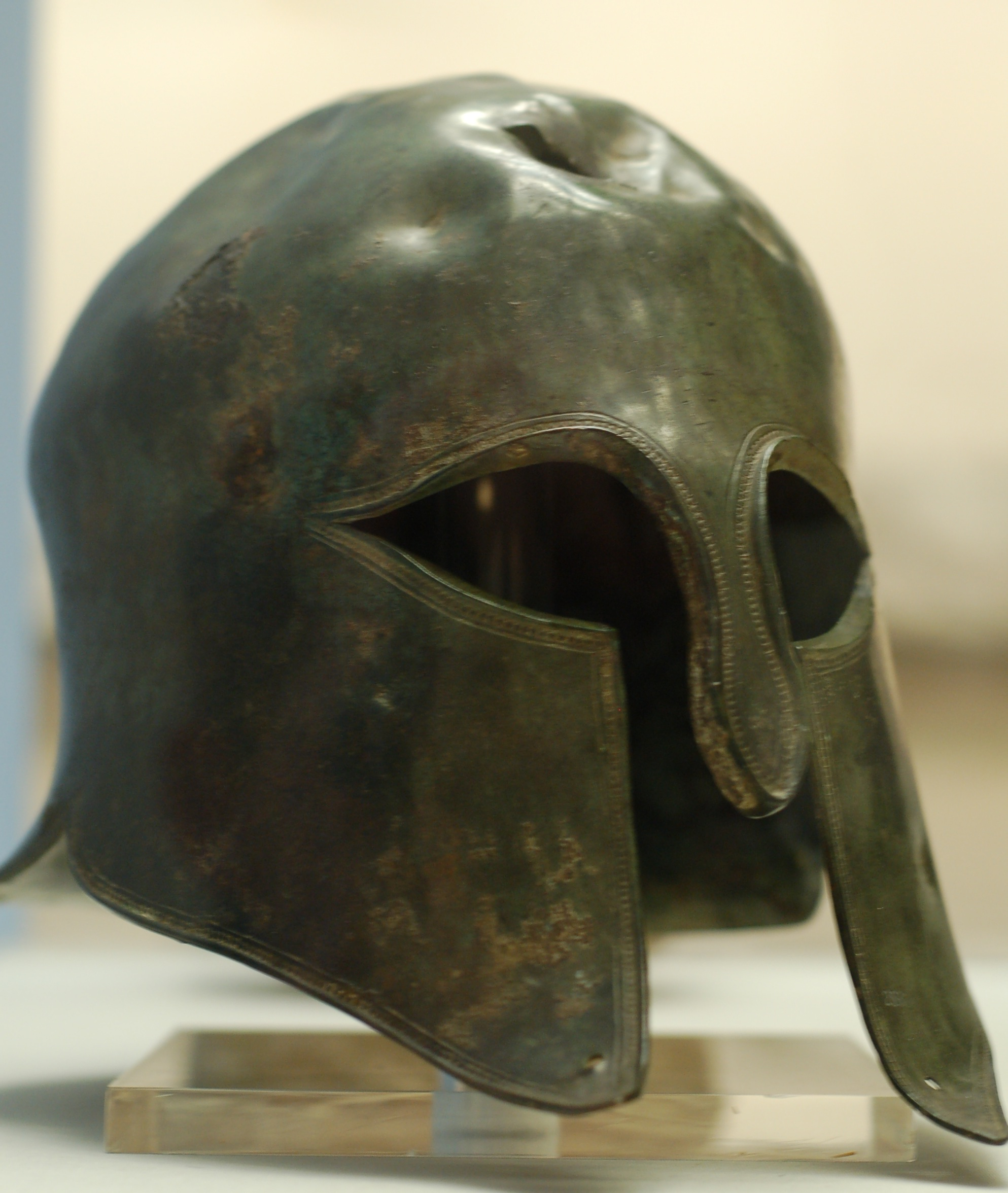
Spartan helmet

Arriving in Chalkidiki in late summer 382 BC, Teleutius linked up with a small Macedonian army, which Amyntas was able to recruit, as well as with a selected detachment of 400 horsemen, who were brought by Derda II, the ruler of Elymyotis in Western Macedonia. The combined forces of the Spartans and their allies exceeded 10,000 men. Having marched with these forces to Olynthos, Teleutius defeated the Chalcidians under the walls of the city, after which he devastated the surrounding area. Derda's cavalry especially distinguished itself in the battle, whose attack, in fact, decided the outcome of the battle. The Olynthian infantry, however, did not suffer significant losses, since they promptly took refuge behind the city walls.

The Olynthians carried out successful raids on cities allied with the Spartans in the spring of 381 BC. Derda's cavalry detachment then invaded the lands of Apollonia.

== Second Battle of Olynthus ==
In May 381 BC Teleutius again approached Olynthos. The Olynthian cavalry crossed the river that flowed near the city in order to secretly get close to the Spartan formations, but were noticed, and Teleutius ordered the chief of the peltasts Tlepolid to attack the horsemen. They did not engage in battle, and went back across the river, and when the peltasts who rushed in pursuit crossed the river and went ashore, the cavalry turned around and attacked the infantrymen who did not have time to line up for battle. Tlepolis and a hundred of his warriors were killed.

Teleutius, according to Xenophon, flew into a rage and ordered his troops to pursue the enemy to the very city walls. This was a mistake, as the Spartans who came too close to the walls were showered with a hail of stones and other projectiles, and were forced to retreat in disarray from the fire zone. The Olynthians took advantage of the Spartans confusion and made a sortie against the Spartans with all their might. Teleutius died in the battle, and his army fled and took refuge in the allied cities. According to Diodorus, Spartan losses exceeded 1,200 men.

== End of the war ==
The Spartans then equipped a new army led by King Agesipolis. He approached Olynthos, but since the enemy did not come out to fight this time, the Spartans began to devastate the area. Toroni, allied to the Olynthians, was taken. In the summer of 380 BC Agesipolis died of fever. The harmost Polybiades blockaded Olynthos and starved the city into capitulation by autumn 379 BC.

The Chalcidian League was dissolved, Olynthus became a satellite of Sparta, and the lands both ceded to the Olynthians and captured by them were returned to Macedonia.

== Result ==
The defeat of the Chalcidian League and the subjugation of Thebes significantly strengthened the Spartan hegemony, which had been shaken during the Corinthian War. However, it turned out that this victory was the last for Sparta. The cynical policy of the Spartans, who did not care about the interests of other states, caused a response, and the last straw that broke the patience of the non-Spartan Greeks was the entry of the Spartan garrison into Cadmea.

The Spartans liquidated the Chalcidian League on the basis of the provisions of the Peace of Antalcidas, which asserted the independence of individual policies and prohibited hegemonic alliances. The Spartans hoped that politically fragmented Greece would not be able to escape their influence. However, in accordance with the Peace of Antalcidas, the Peloponnesian League led by Sparta was also subject to dissolution; however, it never occurred to the Spartans that anyone could seriously demand this.

But the following year, the democratic coup took place in Thebes, and the Athenians began the formation of the anti-Spartan League, the constitution of which corresponded to the conditions of the Royal Peace. The days of Spartan hegemony were numbered.

== Sources ==
- Eugene N. Borza (2013). History of ancient Macedonia. St. Petersburg State University; Nestor-History. p. 592. ISBN 978-5-8465-1367-9.
- Paul Cartledge (1987). Agesilaos and the Crisis of Sparta. Duckworth. ISBN 9780715620823.
- Püst, Wilhelm. Manual of Ancient Geography & History. p. 153. ISBN 1-4255-4670-6.
- Anton Powell (editor), A Companion to Sparta, Hoboken, Wiley, 2018. ISBN 978-1-4051-8869-2
