= Pyrgus (Elis) =

Pyrgus or Pyrgos (Ancient Greek: Πύργος) was a fortified town of a district called Perippia, in Hollow Elis, in ancient Elis. It is mentioned by Polybius in conjunction with Lasion

Its site is unlocated.
