= Margaia =

Margaia may refer to:

- Mărgaia, a village in Lupșa, Romania
- Margaea, a town in ancient Elis, Greece
