= Xenagus =

Spartan military title

A xenagus (Greek: ξεναγός) was a senior Spartan military officer during the Peloponnesian War (431–404 BCE). The title was held by the Spartan commanders of the contingents provided to the Spartans by their allies in the Peloponnesian League.
