= Pylus (Triphylia) =

Town in Triphylia in ancient Elis

Pylus or Pylos (Ancient Greek: Πύλος) was a town in Triphylia in ancient Elis, mentioned only by Strabo, and surnamed by him Τριφυλιακός, Ἀρκαδικός, and Λεπρεατικός. He describes it as situated 30 stadia from the sea, on the rivers Mamathus and Arcadicus, west of the mountain Minthe and north of Lepreum. Upon the conquest of the Triphylian towns by the Eleians, Pylus was annexed to Lepreum. Strabo also contended that this Pylus was the homeland of Nestor because in its vicinity passed the Alpheus, territory where the kingdom of Nestor was supposed to extend and because, according to him, it was the only one of the three cities called Pylus - see Pylus (Elis) and Pylus (Messenia) for the others - that was far from the coast, which corresponded to the story of Telemachus's visit to Pylus in the Odyssey.

According to Greek mythology, it was the place where Hermes drove the cows that he stole from Apollo to sacrifice two of them to the gods.

Wilhelm Dörpfeld located Pylus in the territory of the current village of Kakovatos, although the distance from it to the sea is less than that indicated by Strabo. Others leave it as unlocated.
