= Pylus =

Pylus or Pylos may refer to:

== Places ==
- Pylos, a bay and town in Messenia, Greece
- Pylus (Elis), a city in ancient Elis, Greece
- Pylus (Triphylia), a town in ancient Elis, Greece
- Pylos-Nestor, a Greek municipality

== Other ==
- Pylos Combat Agate, a sealstone from Pylos
- Pylus (mythology), a figure in Greek mythology
- Pylos (board game), a board game
- Pylus (beetle), a checkered beetle genus
