= Peloponnesian League =

Military alliance led by Sparta, c. 550 – 366 BC

- c. 550 BC–366 BC
- Sparta and Peloponnesian League (red) shown at the outset of the Peloponnesian War around 431 BC.
- Capital: Sparta
- Common languages: Doric Greek
- Religion: Ancient Greek religion
- Government: Hegemonic confederacy, military alliance
- History
  - Established: c. 550 BC
  - Disestablished: 366 BC
Succeeded by
Theban hegemony

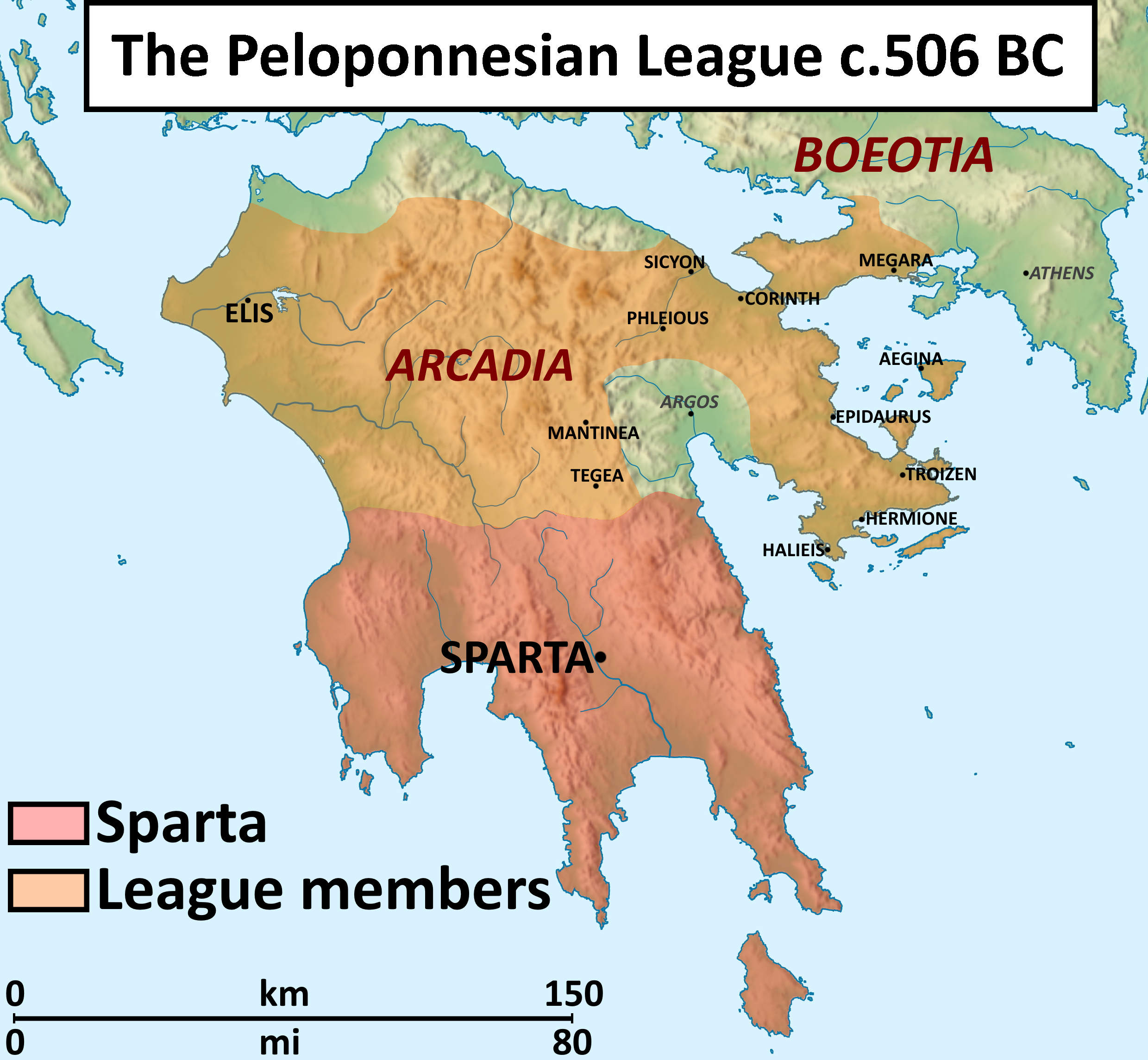
The first members of the Peloponnesian League before 506 BC, according to G. E. M. de Ste. Croix

The Peloponnesian League (/pɛləpəˈniːʃən/) was an alliance of ancient Greek city-states, dominated by Sparta and centred on the Peloponnese, which lasted from c. 550 to 366 BC. It is known mainly for being one of the two rivals in the Peloponnesian War (431–404 BC), against the Delian League, which was dominated by Athens.

== Name ==
The Peloponnesian League is the modern name given to the Spartan system of alliances, but it is inaccurate because there were members outside the Peloponnese, and it was not really a league. The ancient name of the League was "the Lacedemonians and their allies". This is misleading as well, because Sparta could have allies outside of the Peloponnesian League.

== History ==
=== Foundation (c. 550 BC) ===
In its early history, Sparta expanded by conquering Laconia and Messenia and reducing their population into slavery (as helots), but the subjugation of Tegea on its northern border failed at the battle of the Fetters. Following this defeat, Sparta abandoned its military conquests and adopted a diplomatic strategy, known as the "bones policy", by appropriating the relics of mythical heroes worshipped in the Peloponnese, starting with Orestes, the son of Agamemnon, whose bones were transferred from Tegea to Sparta. This new diplomacy was likely sponsored by Chilon, ephor c. 556, who therefore enabled Sparta to present itself as the natural successor of the mythical Achaean kingdom of Agamemnon as described by Homer. Tegea then signed an alliance treaty with Sparta, which became the starting point of the subsequent Peloponnesian League.

Tegea was pushed towards Sparta by its fear of Argos, its eastern neighbour. For the same reason, all the other neighbours of Argos rapidly concluded treaties with Sparta on the Tegean model: Mantinea, Phlieus, Corinth, Epidaurus and the other cities of Argolis. They were followed by Elis, the large city of the western Peloponnesus, and all the Arcadian communities of central Peloponnesus. By 540s, Sparta had concluded alliances with all the Peloponnesian cities, apart from Argos and Achaean cities on the northern shore.

There was no collective treaty between all the members of the League. As hegemon (leader of the League), Sparta concluded a separate treaty with each member, which therefore entered the League upon its conclusion. Each member swore the same oath with Sparta: "to have the same friends and enemies as the Spartans, and to follow them whithersoever they may lead". League members were consequently not bound together, only to Sparta, and could even wage war on each other. However, in 378 a League decision forbade internal wars if the League was operating an army outside of the Peloponnese, but perhaps this disposition had already been in place from much earlier and was a part of the constitution of the League. L. H. Jefery summarises the constitution of the League as "a circle centred on Sparta, with the spokes of a wheel but not necessarily with the added cross-links of a web."

The League treaties contained defensive obligations: Sparta had to assist an ally attacked by a non-League member, and conversely the allies had to help Sparta in case of an attack. The famous Spartan fear of the helots is shown by a special clause providing that allies had to assist Sparta in case of a slave revolt and must not offer citizenship to Messenians, because the Arcadians assisted the latter during the Spartan conquest of Messenia. This clause was activated in the 460s during the Third Messenian War. The treaties between Sparta and the allies were also permanent, with a clause forbidding secession. Several secessions did occur, but as a result of a breach of a treaty. Seceding members usually pointed out a breach of the treaties from Sparta to leave. The procedure to admit new members is not known. Sparta could either decide alone, or request the approval from their allies in the subsequent League congress.

Another reason for the allies to remain within the League, despite their loss of autonomy, was the support of oligarchy by Sparta. The oligarchs that ruled most of the League members could rely on Sparta to retain their status in their city. Moreover, many of them had friendship ties with Spartan citizens, or even the kings. The Spartan king Agesilaus II (r. c. 400 – c. 360) was especially known for his guest friendships (xenia) among his allies. Thanks to these friendships, leading oligarchs could send their sons to the agoge, the Spartan education system, where they became trophimoi xenoi, and further developed their attachment to Sparta.

=== Reform of 506 BC ===
A major change in the organisation of the League took place c. 506, when the Spartan king Cleomenes I attempted to capture Athens and place at its head his friend Isagoras as tyrant or as member of an oligarchy. A full army of the League was called and marched on Athens, but the Corinthians returned home when they discovered the purpose of the expedition, also encouraged by the other king Demaratus, who opposed Cleomenes. The campaign therefore failed, and as a result Sparta had to concede the creation of a congress of the League, where members could vote on war and peace. It means that before that time, Sparta could call its allies at will without informing them of the purposes of the war.

The Peloponnesian League therefore became a bicameral organisation, with two assemblies: the Spartan ecclesia and the congress of the League, both chaired by an ephor. Spartan citizens first debated the matter between them in the ecclesia. If a positive vote was reached in the ecclesia, the congress of the League was called, where the allies debated and voted on Sparta's proposal. Allies' votes were worth exactly the same in the League congress, but Sparta likely did not participate in the vote, since its decision was already made by the ecclesia. League members were bound by the result of the League congress even if they had voted against it. Approval of the congress was necessary to declare a League war or make peace.

Several instances of allies rejecting Sparta's proposals in the congress are known. The first of them took place c. 504, when Sparta summoned what was perhaps the first congress of the League in order to attack Athens and install Hippias as tyrant, but the allies led by Corinth unanimously rejected it. In 440, Sparta wanted to renew war against Athens, but the allies led by Corinth refused to go to war. These events show the great influence exercised by Corinth within the League, thanks to its strategic position on the Isthmus. Moreover, the Corinthians often opposed Sparta or forced its hand, such as in 421, when they refused to swear the oath required by the Peace of Nicias with Athens in the middle of the Peloponnesian War. Their reason was that they would have infringed on some separate treaties concluded with their Thracian allies. In 396, they might have refused to follow Sparta because one of their temples burnt, which was seen as bad omen. The Corinthians seems to have fully exploited exemptions granted when "gods and heroes" were involved in opposition to League orders. Indeed, as most international decisions were bound by sacred oaths and the Spartans notoriously devout, using religious motives was a good way to avoid League obligations. Other League members are known to have used the same tricks, such as Phlious, which did not participate to the battle of Nemea in 394 because of an opportune sacred truce.

In war, Sparta had exclusive command of the League army. One of the kings was usually commander-in-chief (it could also be a regent); Spartan officers named xenagoi supervised the levy among the allies and decided how much troops each ally should contribute.

=== Persian invasion ===
In the academic literature of the 19th and early 20th centuries, it was often assumed that the Peloponnesian League was the same as the Hellenic League, the alliance in charge of the resistance against the Persian Empire. In this view, Athens and its allies simply joined the Peloponnesian League to fight the Persians. The Hellenic League was actually a distinct and new creation for the conduct of war against Persia.

=== Wars against Athenian hegemony ===
Tensions between the Peloponnesian and Delian Leagues were key in the outbreak of the First Peloponnesian War in 460 BC. The conflict between two Peloponnesian League members, Corinth and Megara, specifically the latter's defection to the Athenians due to perceived neglect by the Spartans, was a key factor in the outbreak of hostilities between the two Leagues. That war ended with the reintegration of Megara into the League. The two Leagues eventually came into conflict again with each other in the Peloponnesian War. Under Spartan leadership, the League defeated Athens and its allies in 404 BC.

=== Spartan hegemony and Reform of 378 BC ===
In 378, the League was reorganised in 10 military districts, while there had been no intermediary administrative level before. Several reasons can explain this new structure: Sparta probably wanted to enhance the League's efficiency after the recent inclusion of the distant Chalkidike. Moreover, the districts may have increased the number of available troops, while also lessening the burden on the allies by better spreading their contributions among them. Each district had to contribute 3,000 to 4,000 hoplites to the League army, which therefore had a theoretical army of at least 30,000 men. In fact, as League members contributed different kinds of troops, a ratio of 1 cavalryman=4 hoplites=8 light troops was set up to balance contingents from each district. Starting in 383, League members could also opt to pay in cash to avoid sending men, with a rate of twelve Aeginetan obols per day for a cavalryman, and three for a hoplite. This option was apparently favoured by many cities; it suited Sparta, which could hire mercenaries. Only one xenagos was needed for each district, therefore easing the manpower pressure on Sparta, which suffered from a severe demographic decline in the 4th century; xenagoi previously had to be sent to every city member of the League.

The ten districts were:

1. Lacedemonia, the territory of Sparta in the southern Peloponnese
2. Arcadia (south?), one half of the historical region, perhaps centred on Tegea. Populous Arcadia was split in two in order to balance the number of soldiers between districts.
3. Arcadia (north?), the other half, perhaps centered on Mantinea
4. Elis, the western Peloponnese
5. Achaea, the northern Peloponnese
6. Corinth and Megara, located on the Isthmus
7. Sicyon, Phlius and the Acte (now the Argolis), the northeastern Peloponnese
8. Acarnania, in western Greece
9. Phokis and Lokris, in central Greece
10. Olynthos and Thrace, which had just been conquered.

=== War against Thebes and end of the League ===
During its hegemony, Sparta adopted a more interventionist policy to preserve its supremacy over Greece. Elis had left the League since 420, but Sparta had to wait until the end of the Peloponnesian War to act on it; c. 400, Sparta forced Elis back into the League, but also massively weakened it by giving independence to its periokoi cities of the Akrorians and Triphylians. These cities organised as federal states joined the Peloponnesian League as single units.

In 385, Mantinea was disbanded into villages to punish its hegemonic behaviour in Arcadia, where Sparta had always adopted a "divide and rule" policy to prevent its unification. This blatant violation of the autonomy proclaimed during the King's Peace of 387 was bitterly received. The defeat of Sparta by Thebes at Leuctra in 371 BC decisively shook its control of the League members. As a result of the battle, Thebes succeeded Sparta as hegemon of Greece. In Arcadia, the Mantineans were the first to act by reconstituting their city. This time, the other Arcadian cities supported them, even their traditional rival Tegea, where pro-Mantinean democrats took over the pro-Spartan oligarchs. United by their hostility to Sparta, the Arcadians could then create the federal Arcadian League and left the Peloponnesian League.

The size of the Peloponnesian League was then further reduced by the Theban liberation of Messenia from Spartan control in 369 BC. The states of the north-eastern Peloponnese, including Corinth, Sicyon and Epidauros, adhered to their Spartan allegiance, but as the war continued in the 360s BC, many joined the Thebans or took a neutral position, though Elis and some of the Arcadian states like Mantinea realigned themselves with Sparta.

== List of members ==
=== Original members (before c. 504 BC) ===
- Tegea was the first ally of Sparta in the alliance that evolved into the Peloponnesian League.
- Corinth joined c. 550. It was the most important member of the League beside Sparta. In 395, it left the League because of the Corinthian War, but returned to Sparta with the King's Peace in 387. Its departure in 366 following the Spartan defeat against Thebes at Leuctra effectively ended the League.
- Sicyon remained a member without interruption until 369, when it was conquered by Epaminondas.
- Epidaurus joined because it felt threatened by Argos. It remained a member without interruption until 366.
- Phleius joined because of the threat from Argos. Sparta intervened into its internal politics to protect the Phleiasian oligarchs in 384 and 381. The oligarchs then remained loyal to Sparta until 366.
- Halieis probably remained a member until the campaign of Epaminondas in Argolis in 369.
- Megara possibly joined the League thanks to the intervention of king Cleomenes I in c. 519. Megara frequently shifted allegiances between Sparta and Athens. It might have left before 511, since an expedition of the Spartan general Anchimolius against Athens did not pass through the isthmus. It was possibly forced to rejoin by Cleomenes in c. 510 when he unseated the tyrant Hippias from Athens, after which he also punished Megara by giving the island of Salamis to Athens. Megara left the League again in 461 following a border war against Corinth and joined the Delian League led by Athens, which precipitated the First Peloponnesian War. It rejoined in 448. Megara remained in the League until its dissolution.
- Aegina became member before the end of the 6th century. It left the League in 457 after its capture by Athens, and joined instead the Delian League. The city was destroyed by Athens in 431. Aegina was refounded by Lysander in 405 with the defeat of Athens and returned to the League.
- Troezen left the League to Athens in 457, but rejoined following the Thirty Years' Peace. It remained loyal to Sparta until 366.
- Hermione left the League to Athens c. 450, but rejoined following the Thirty Years' Peace. It probably remained a member until the campaign of Epaminondas in Argolis in 369.
- Elis was one of the earliest members of the League; it had already been allied with Sparta for two centuries. Like Sparta, it had many dependent cities of perioecic status. In 420, Elis left the League because Sparta recognised the independence of perioecic Lepreon. Sparta had to wait until the end of the Peloponnesian War to turn against Elis in the Elean War c. 400. Victorious, Sparta forced Elis back into the league, as well as to release all its perioecic cities, which presumably formed two federal states and joined the Peloponnesian League. Elis defected again in 370 after Leuctra.
- Mantinea defected from the League in 421, but rejoined after its defeat against Sparta in 418. It left again after Leuctra to found the Arcadian League.
- Orchomenus (Arcadian) was forced to temporarily defect in 418 by the coalition of Elis, Mantinea, Argos and Athens, but rejoined after the battle of Mantinea.
- The situation in the rest of Arcadia is difficult to track, with many small communities organised in tribes and leagues of their own. However, all of these communities were members of the Peloponnesian League, which they left in 370 to have founded the Arcadian League around the city of Megalopolis.

=== Later additions (after c. 504 BC) ===
- Mycenae joined after the battle of Sepeia in 494, when Argos was defeated by Sparta. However, c. 460 Argos took advantage of the Helot Revolt in Sparta to reconquer and destroy Mycenae.
- Tiryns probably joined after Sepeia in 494. It was recaptured some years after 468 and destroyed.
- The Boeotian League was already an ally of Sparta at the end of the 6th century, but apparently not a member of the Peloponnesian League. It more probably joined the League in the years between the Thirty Years' Peace in 446 and the beginning of the Peloponnesian war in 431, "as a single unit". Thebes and other members of the Boeotian League left in 395 at the beginning of the Corinthian War (398–387), of which Thebes was a key player against Sparta. Thebes likely returned to the League after the King's Peace of 387. Thebes left the Peloponnesian League for good in 378.
- The Phocians probably joined the league as a single unit at the same time as the Boeotians, between 446 and 431.
- The Eastern Locrians probably joined the league as a single unit at the same time as the Boeotians, between 446 and 431.
- The Acarnanian cities of Ambracia, Leucas and Anactorium, possibly joined between 446 and 431. They certainly joined the League in 389/8, after their defeat against Sparta. They left in 375.
- Pellene was the first Achaean city to join the League in 431 (it acted independently several times from its federal structure, the Achaean League). The city was conquered by Epaminondas in 367 and allied with Thebes.
- The Achaean League apparently followed Pellene and joined as a single unit by 429. In 417 Sparta forced the Achaeans to adopt an oligarchic constitution. The Achaeans were conquered by Epaminondas in 366. By 389, the Achaeans controlled Pleuron, Kalydon and Naupaktos on the northern shore of the Corinthian Gulf, which they lost in 366.
- Athens was forced to join the League in 404 following its defeat in the Peloponnesian War. Athens left the League in 395 with the Corinthian War.
- Eleusis became independent from Athens in 403, as a refuge of the Thirty Tyrants, and joined the League until it was recovered by Athens in 401.
- The Akrorians were freed from Elis c. 400; they formed a federal state and joined the League, probably as a single unit.
- The Triphylians were freed from Elis c. 400; they formed a federal state and joined the League, probably as a single unit.
- Olynthus and the Chalkidians joined the League after its defeat against Sparta in 378.

== List of wars of the Peloponnesian League ==
- War against Polycrates: c. 525, Corinth and exiled Samians encouraged Sparta to launch an attack against Polycrates, tyrant of Samos. The expedition was a failure.
- War against Hippias: c. 511, Sparta sent a first naval army against Athens, at the time ruled by the tyrant Hippias, perhaps because of his pro-Persian policies, or a Delphic order. The marines disembarked by Anchimolus were defeated by Hippias' Thessalian allies. The following year, Cleomenes I came back with a larger force through land; he took the Acropolis and forced Hippias to go into exile in the Persian Empire.
- Second Persian invasion of Greece
- First Peloponnesian War
- Second Peloponnesian War
- Corinthian War
- First Olynthian War: In summer 382, the Peloponnesian League attacked the Chalkidian league, dominated by Olynthus. Officially, Sparta answered the call from the cities of Akanthos and Apollonia against Olynthus, but they actually helped the Macedonian king Amyntas who had been dethroned by Olynthus, which also threatened Spartan hegemony in northern Greece. The war was difficult, but in 379 Olynthus surrendered; the federation disbanded and its members were forced to join the Peloponnesian League.
- Boeotian War

== Bibliography ==
- Hans Beck & Peter Funke (editors), Federalism in Greek antiquity, Cambridge University Press, 2015. ISBN 978-0-521-19226-2
- John Boardman et al., The Cambridge Ancient History, volume IV, Persia Greece, and the Eastern Mediterranean, from c. 525 to 479 B.C., Cambridge University Press, 1988. ISBN 0-521-22804-2
- Jim Capreedy, "A League within a League: The Preservation of the Elean Symmachy", The Classical World, Vol. 101, No. 4 (Summer, 2008), pp. 485–503.
- Paul Cartledge, Agesilaos and the Crisis of Sparta, Baltimore, Johns Hopkins University Press, 1987. ISBN 978-0-7156-3032-7
- ——, Sparta and Lakonia, A Regional History 1300–362 BC, London, Routledge, 2002 (originally published in 1979). ISBN 0-415-26276-3
- W. G. Forrest, A History of Sparta, New York, Norton, 1986. SBN 393004813
- Peter Funke, Nino Luraghi (editors), The Politics of Ethnicity and the Crisis of the Peloponnesian League, Hellenic Studies Series 32, Washington DC, Center for Hellenic Studies, 2009. ISBN 9780674031999
- Mogens Herman Hansen & Thomas Heine Nielsen (editors), An Inventory of Archaic and Classical Poleis, Oxford University Press, 2004.
- G. L. Huxley, Early Sparta, London, Faber & Faber, 1962. ISBN 0-389-02040-0
- Jakob A. O. Larsen, "The Constitution of the Peloponnesian League", Classical Philology, Vol. 28, No. 4 (Oct., 1933), pp. 257–276.
- Anton Powell (editor), A Companion to Sparta, Hoboken, Wiley, 2018. ISBN 978-1-4051-8869-2
- J. B. Salmon, Wealthy Corinth, A History of the City to 338 BC, Oxford, Clarendon Press, 1984. ISBN 0-19-814833-X
- G. E. M. de Ste. Croix, The Origins of the Peloponnesian War, London, Duckworth, 1972. ISBN 0-7156-0640-9
- P. J. Stylianou, A Historical Commentary on Diodorus Siculus, Book 15, Oxford, Clarendon Press, 1998. ISBN 0-19-815239-6
- Konrad Wickert, Der peloponnesische Bund von seiner Entstehung bis zum Ende des Archidamischen Krieges, Erlangen, 1961.
