= Macistus (Elis) =

City of ancient Elis

Coordinates: 37°36′17″N 21°40′33″E

Macistus or Makistos (Ancient Greek: Μάκιστος), or Macistum or Makiston (Μάκιστον), was a city of ancient Elis, in Greece. It is one of the six cities (along with Lepreum, Phrixae, Pyrgus, Epium, and Nudium) founded by the Minyans in the territory of the Paroreatae and Caucones.

Pausanias writes that in the time of king Pyrrhus of Pisatis, the cities of Pisa, Macistus, Scillus, and Dyspontium rebelled against the Eleans because of the organization of the Olympic Games. Pisa and its allies were defeated and their cities were destroyed (c. 575 BC).

Herodotus comments that, in his time, most of the cities founded by the Minyans were ravaged by the Eleans. It is supposed that this happened around 460 BC, after the Third Messenian War. The town is also mentioned by Xenophon in the framework of the war between Elis and Sparta led by Agis II about the year 400 BC.

According to Artemidorus, it was uninhabited since the 2nd century BC. Strabo places it in the region of Triphylia and says that it also had the name of Platanistus (Πλατανιστοῦς). In addition, he calls its territory "Macistia" and indicates that it extended beyond the Neda River.

There has been controversy about its exact location and it has even been suggested that it could have been the same city as Sami. However, modern scholars locate Macistus at a site called Mazi within the bounds of the modern town of Skillounta.
