= Epitalium =

Town in ancient Elis

Coordinates: 37°38′02″N 21°28′54″E

Epitalium or Epitalion (Ancient Greek: Ἐπιτάλιον) was a town of Triphylia in ancient Elis, near the coast and a little south of the river Alpheius.

== History ==
=== Late Bronze Age ===
It was identified with the Homeric Thryon (Θρύον) or Thryoessa (Θρυόεσσα), a town listed in the Catalogue of Ships in the Iliad as in the dominions of Nestor, which the poet describes as a place upon a lofty hill near the ford of the river Alpheius.

=== Classical Age ===
Epitalium was an important military post, because it commanded the ford of the Alpheius and the road leading along the coast. Xenophon relates that, like the other dependent townships of Triphylia, it revolted from Elis when Agis II, the Spartan king, invaded the country in 401 BCE; and when Agis returned home, after ravaging Elis, he left a garrison in Epitalium.

It is mentioned by Polybius; in the year 218 BCE, Philip V of Macedon took several cities of Elis among which was Epitalium.

The site of Epitalium is at the modern town of Epitalio, which was renamed to reflect the association with the ancient town.
