= Peloponnesians =

Peloponnesians may refer to:

- The inhabitants of the Peloponnese peninsula in Greece
- The Peloponnesian League, an alliance of Peloponnesian city-states led by Sparta (from the middle of the 6th century BC to the 360s BC)
