= Bolax (Elis) =

Town of Triphylia, Greece

Bolax (Ancient Greek: Βώλαξ) was a town of Triphylia in ancient Elis. Bolax surrendered to Philip V of Macedon in the Social War.

Its site is unlocated.
