= Lepreus (mythology) =

In Greek mythology, Lepreus (Ancient Greek: Λεπρεύς, lit. 'scaly' or 'rough') was a son of Caucon (Glaucon) or Pyrgeus, and grandson of Poseidon; one account calls him a son of Poseidon. His mother was Astydameia, daughter of Phorbas.

== Mythology ==
Lepreus once advised Augeas to cast Heracles in bonds, so that Augeas would not have to keep his promise to reward Heracles for the cleansing of his stables. Since then, Heracles hated Lepreus, but when he came to Caucon's house after completing his twelve labors, Astydameia insisted that he reconcile with her son. Lepreus then challenged Heracles to several friendly competitions, namely throwing a discus, drawing water, and seeing which of the two was the fastest eater, each having to consume a bull at a time. Despite his absolute confidence, Lepreus lost all the competitions. After getting beaten in a drinking contest as well, he challenged Heracles to single combat and was killed during the match. Pausanias' account of the story only includes the eating contest, in which Lepreus turned out to be a match for Heracles, but the following single combat has the same result as the other accounts.

Lepreus was said to have been buried in Phigalia, but the local inhabitants could not show his tomb. He was also credited with having been the founder and eponym of the city Lepreum, though some believed that it was named after Leprea, daughter of Pyrgeus (that is, a possible sister of Lepreus), or simply after the skin disease known as λέπρα (leprā) which had once struck the local population.
