= Amphidolis =

Coordinates: 37°45′N 21°37′E

Amphidolis (Ancient Greek: Ἀμφιδολίς) or Amphidolia (Ἀμφιδολία) was a town of the Pisatis district in ancient Elis. Its territory was probably to the west of Acroreia, and included the town of Marganeae (or Margalae). Amphidolis is mentioned by Strabo as a market town situated on the mountain road that runs from Elis to Olympia, near Alesiaeum (formerly Aleisium). Xenophon writes that in the war against Elis by the Spartans under Agis II, about 400 BCE, the townsmen of Amphidolis, along with those of other towns, joined the army of Agis and after the treaty ending the hostilities, Elis lost those towns and they were granted their freedom. Later, its townsmen joined the Spartan army and took part in the Battle of Nemea (394 BCE).

Its site is not precisely located.
