= 394 BC =

394 BC in various calendars
- Gregorian calendar: 394 BC; CCCXCIV BC
- Ab urbe condita: 360
- Ancient Egypt era: XXIX dynasty, 5
- Pharaoh: Nepherites I, 5
- Ancient Greek Olympiad (summer): 96th Olympiad, year 3
- Assyrian calendar: 4357
- Balinese saka calendar: N/A
- Bengali calendar: −987 – −986
- Berber calendar: 557
- Buddhist calendar: 151
- Burmese calendar: −1031
- Byzantine calendar: 5115–5116
- Chinese calendar: 丙戌年 (Fire Dog); 2304 or 2097 — to — 丁亥年 (Fire Pig); 2305 or 2098
- Coptic calendar: −677 – −676
- Discordian calendar: 773
- Ethiopian calendar: −401 – −400
- Hebrew calendar: 3367–3368
- Hindu calendars
- Vikram Samvat: −337 – −336
- Shaka Samvat: N/A
- Kali Yuga: 2707–2708
- Holocene calendar: 9607
- Iranian calendar: 1015 BP – 1014 BP
- Islamic calendar: 1046 BH – 1045 BH
- Javanese calendar: N/A
- Julian calendar: N/A
- Korean calendar: 1940
- Minguo calendar: 2305 before ROC 民前2305年
- Nanakshahi calendar: −1861
- Thai solar calendar: 149–150
- Tibetan calendar: མེ་ཕོ་ཁྱི་ལོ་ (male Fire-Dog) −267 or −648 or −1420 — to — མེ་མོ་ཕག་ལོ་ (female Fire-Boar) −266 or −647 or −1419

Year 394 BC was a year of the pre-Julian Roman calendar. At the time, it was known as the Year of the Tribunate of Camillus, Poplicola, Medullinus, Albinus, Mamercinus and Scipio (or, less frequently, year 360 Ab urbe condita). The denomination 394 BC for this year has been used since the early medieval period, when the Anno Domini calendar era became the prevalent method in Europe for naming years.

== Events ==
=== By place ===
==== Greece ====
- The allies, Athens, Thebes, Corinth and Argos, gather a large army at Corinth. A sizable army is sent out from Sparta to challenge this force. The two sides meet on the dry bed of the Nemea River, in Corinthian territory. In the resultant Battle of Nemea, the Spartans win a major victory over the allies.
- The Athenian general Conon, the Persian satrap Pharnabazus and Evagoras, King of Salamis, win an overwhelming naval victory over the Spartans under Peisander in the Battle of Cnidus (near Rhodes). Following this victory, Conon and Pharnabazus sail along the coast of Ionia, expelling Spartan governors and garrisons from the cities, although they fail to reduce the Spartan bases at Abydos and Sestos. With the Spartan bid for building an empire crumbling, Persia gains mastery of the Aegean.
- The two sides' armies meet each other again at Coronea, in Theban territory in the Battle of Coronea. Once more, the Spartans under King Agesilaus II are successful in battle. After this victory, Agesilaus sails with his army across the Gulf of Corinth and returns to Sparta.
- The temple of Athena Alea in Tegea is burned down, but is however soon rebuilt to the designs of Scopas of Paros.
