= LARP6 =

Protein-coding gene in the species Homo sapiens

Identifiers
- Aliases: LARP6, ACHN, La ribonucleoprotein domain family member 6, La ribonucleoprotein 6, translational regulator
- External IDs: OMIM: 611300; MGI: 1914807; GeneCards: LARP6
Available structures
PDB	Ortholog search: PDBe RCSB
PDB	List of PDB id codes 2MTF, 2MTG

Gene location (Human)
Chr.	Chromosome 15 (human)
Band	15q23	Start	70,829,130 bp
Band	15q23	End	70,854,157 bp

Gene location (Mouse)
Chr.	Chromosome 9 (mouse)
Band	9|9 B	Start	60,620,272 bp
Band	9|9 B	End	60,646,084 bp
RNA expression pattern
Bgee	Human / Mouse (ortholog); Top expressed in: external globus pallidus; inferior ganglion of vagus nerve; gastric mucosa; left testis; lateral nuclear group of thalamus; right testis; C1 segment; subthalamic nucleus; inferior olivary nucleus; pars reticulata / Top expressed in: pontine nuclei; lateral geniculate nucleus; superior colliculus; anterior horn of spinal cord; deep cerebellar nuclei; dorsal tegmental nucleus; lateral hypothalamus; ventral tegmental area; piriform cortex; facial motor nucleus; More reference expression data
BioGPS	n/a
Gene ontology
Molecular function	RNA binding; nucleic acid binding; protein binding; sequence-specific mRNA binding; myosin binding; RNA stem-loop binding; mRNA 5'-UTR binding
Cellular component	cytoplasm; nucleus; polysome; ribonucleoprotein complex
Biological process	RNA processing; regulation of translation; positive regulation of collagen biosynthetic process; positive regulation of translation; positive regulation of mRNA binding
Sources:Amigo / QuickGO
Orthologs
Databases	NCBI: entry; OMA: entry
Species	Human	Mouse
Entrez	55323	67557
Ensembl	ENSG00000166173	ENSMUSG00000034839
UniProt	Q9BRS8	Q8BN59
RefSeq (mRNA)	NM_197958; NM_001286679; NM_018357	NM_026235
RefSeq (protein)	NP_001273608; NP_060827; NP_932062	NP_080511
Location (UCSC)	Chr 15: 70.83 – 70.85 Mb	Chr 9: 60.62 – 60.65 Mb
PubMed search
- Wikidata
View/Edit Human	View/Edit Mouse

La-related protein 6 also known as Acheron or La ribonucleoprotein domain family member 6 (LARP6), is a protein that in humans is encoded by the LARP6 gene.

== Clinical relevance ==
In a recent genome-wide association study, LARP6 gene has been associated with fasting glucose traits, type 2 diabetes and obesity.
