= Eric W. Robinson =

American historian

Eric W. Robinson is an American historian of ancient Greece, specializing in early democracy. He is currently a professor at Indiana University. In 1986, he graduated with a BA from Yale University. After studying under noted historian Donald Kagan as an undergraduate, he received his Ph.D. from the University of Pennsylvania in 1994. From 1999 to 2006, Robinson was an associate professor at Harvard University, where he won the Roslyn Abramson Award for outstanding undergraduate teaching.

Robinson has written and edited several works, including The First Democracies: Early Popular Government Outside Athens, Oikistes: Studies in Constitutions, Colonies, and Military Power in the Ancient World Offered in Honor of A. J. Graham, Ancient Greek Democracy: Readings and Sources, and Democracy Beyond Athens: Popular Government in the Greek Classical Age.
