= Carambis =

Ancient Greek city of ancient Paphlagonia

Coordinates: 42°00′49″N 33°22′11″E

Carambis or Karambis (Ancient Greek: Κάραμβις) was an ancient Greek city of ancient Paphlagonia, on a promontory of the same name. The town is mentioned in the Periplus of Pseudo-Scylax (under the name Caramus or Karamos) and by Pliny the Elder. The name occurs as Carambas in the Peutinger Table.

The promontory is now known as Kerempe Burnu. Its site is tentatively located near Fakas, Kastamonu Province, Turkey.
