= Triphylians =

Triphylians (Ancient Greek: Τριφύλιοι or Τρίφυλοι) were an ancient Greek tribe. They were residents of the western Peloponnese region, which in Homeric times was called Pylos and later Triphylia. The name Triphylia, literally emerged from the fact of the establishment of three different tribes in the area. The Homeric cities of Pylos, Kyparisieis and Dorion enjoyed great growth and prosperity. Triphylia and its residents had the benefit of independence and self-government until the second Messenian war, in 628 BC, when they fell into the authority of the Spartans, who later handed Triphylia over to the Eleans. Triphylians remained enslaved under the sovereignty of Eleans throughout the Peloponnesian war, excluding a short period during which they managed to recover their autonomy. In 366 BC Triphylians fell again to the jurisdiction of Elis, until the establishment of the Achaean League, when they gain their independence as part of the confederation’s members.

In the years 220–217 BC, Trifylia was conquered by the king Philip V and came under the influence of Macedonia. In the early Roman times, a large part of Triphylia regained its autonomy.
