= Acheron (Elis) =

Alpine river

The Acheron (Ancient Greek: Ἀχέρων) was a small river of Triphylia in ancient Elis, flowing northward from the Minthe Mountains and joining the Alpheius River as a tributary.
