= Anchimolus =

Spartan military commander (died 511 BC)

Anchimolus (Ancient Greek: Ἀγχίμολος Anchimolos; died 511 BC) was a Spartan military commander who died while leading an unsuccessful expedition against the Athenian tyrant Hippias in 511 BC. He was possibly the first Spartan navarch.

== Life ==
Anchimolus, son of Aster, was a Spartiate who received command of Sparta's first expedition against the Athenian tyrant Hippias. The incursion on Attica was carried out by sea rather than on land as was Spartan custom, possibly to avoid opposition from the city of Megara during the march. This meant that the expedition was a small one, led as it was by a private citizen rather than one of Sparta's kings, and because ships could only carry a few troops, all on foot. Anchimolus and his force landed at Phalerum, while Hippias recruited the aid of 1000 allied Thessalian horsemen, led by a local king of theirs, Cineas. He felled some local woods to create a favourable terrain for them, and attacked the Spartans, who lacked a screening force. The Spartans, unprepared to face this strong body of cavalry, were defeated and driven back to their ships. Anchimolus was among the dead, and afterwards buried in Alopece near the temple of Heracles at Cynosarges.

It has been suggested that Anchimolus was the first Spartan to hold the office of navarch (leader of ships).

The name Anchimolus, which means 'close at hand', is an extremely rare name in recorded ancient Greek history.
