= Agesipolis I =

King of Sparta, 394–380 BC

King of Sparta
- Reign: 394–380 BC
- Predecessor: Pausanias
- Successor: Cleombrotus I
- Co-ruler: Agesilaus II
- Died: 380 BC; Aphytis
- Greek: Ἀγησίπολις
- Dynasty: Agiad
- Father: Pausanias

Agesipolis I (Ancient Greek: Ἀγησίπολις; died 380 BC) was the twenty-first of the kings of the Agiad dynasty in ancient Sparta.

Agesipolis succeeded his father Pausanias, while still a minor, in 394 BC, and reigned fourteen years. Upon the banishment of Pausanias, Agesipolis and his brother, Cleombrotus I, were both placed under the guardianship of Aristodemus, their nearest relative. Agesipolis came to the crown just about the time that the confederacy (partly brought about by the intrigues of the Persian satrap Tithraustes), which was formed by Thebes, Athens, Corinth, and Argos, against Sparta, rendering it necessary to recall his colleague, Agesilaus II, from Asia; and the first military operation of his reign was the expedition to Corinth, where the forces of the confederates were assembled.

The Spartan army was led by Aristodemus, and gained a victory over the allies. In 390 Agesipolis, who had now come of age, was entrusted with the command of an army for the invasion of Argolis. Having procured the sanction of the Olympic and Delphic gods for disregarding any attempt which the Argives might make to stop his march, on the pretext of a religious truce, he carried his ravages still farther than Agesilaus had done in 393; but as he suffered the aspect of the victims to deter him from occupying a permanent post, the expedition yielded no fruit but the plunder.

In 385 the Spartans, seizing upon some frivolous pretexts, sent an expedition against Mantinea, in which Agesipolis undertook the command, after it had been declined by Agesilaus. In this expedition the Spartans were assisted by Thebes, and in a battle with the Mantineans, the Theban generals Epaminondas and Pelopidas narrowly escaped death. Agesipolis took the town by diverting the river Ophis, so as to put the low ground at the foot of the city walls under water. The basements, being made of unbaked bricks, were unable to resist the action of the water. The walls soon began to totter, and the Mantineans were forced to surrender. They were admitted to terms on condition that the population should be dispersed among the four hamlets, out of which it had been collected to form the capital. The democratic leaders were permitted to go into exile.

Early in 382, an embassy came to Sparta from the cities of Acanthus and Apollonia, requesting assistance against the Chalcidian League, who were endeavoring to compel them to join their confederacy. The Spartans granted it, but were not at first very successful. After the defeat and death of Teleutias in the second campaign in 381 Agesipolis took the command. He set out in 381, but did not begin operations until the spring of 380. He then acted with great vigor, and took Toroni by storm; but in the midst of his successes he was seized with a fever, which carried him off in seven days. He died in the town of Aphytis, in the peninsula of Pallene. His body was immersed in honey and conveyed home to Sparta for burial.

Though Agesipolis did not share the ambitious views of foreign conquest cherished by Agesilaus, his loss was deeply regretted by Agesilaus, who seems to have had a sincere regard for him. He was succeeded as king by his brother Cleombrotus I. Paul Cartledge, however, suggests that Agesilaus' grief was partly due to the loss of a malleable "partner in crime".

| Preceded by Pausanias | Agiad King of Sparta; 394–380 BC | Succeeded by Cleombrotus I |
