= Caucones =

Tribe of Anatolia

The Caucones /kɔːˈkoʊˌniːz, kəˈkoʊˌniːz/ (Ancient Greek: Καύκωνες Kaukônes) were an autochthonous tribe of Anatolia (modern-day Turkey), who later migrated to parts of the Greek mainland (Arcadia, Triphylian Pylos and Elis).

== Origin and early history ==
The phonology of the name Caucones has been taken as evidence for an origin in the Caucasus Mountains. It is also suggested that they are related to the Late Bronze Age Kaskians, who Hittite tablets locate along the southern shore of the Black Sea. According to Herodotus and other classical era writers, the Caucones were among the tribes displaced or absorbed by the Bithynians, who had migrated from Thrace.

== In myth and literature ==
The Iliad lists the Caucones among the Trojan allies. In Book X, the Trojan herald Dolon describes their homeland as "towards the sea" and mentions them alongside the Carians, Paionians, Leleges, and Pelasgians. In the Odyssey (3.366), Athena tells Nestor at Pylos that she will "go to the Caucones, where there's an old debt still owing me, not a small amount." This allusion may refer to a subgroup of Caucones who had migrated to mainland Greece, as reported by Strabo.

Other references to the Caucones in epic tradition may have been attempts to recognize the Caucones as deserving a place in the Neleiad kingdom in southwestern Greece. Efforts were made, we are told by Pausanias (4.1.5). to 'historicize' Kaukon as the early ancestor of the Athenian genos Lykomidai around 480 BC by inventing a grandson of an earth-born Phlyus named Kaukon who taught the Eleusinian Mysteries to a royal queen Messene. His name was Kaukon, a teacher of religious rites.

Their penetration beyond Arcadia (Strabo 7.7.1–2) and their claims to be sons of Lycaon or Lycos (Apollodorus, Library 3.8.1) explains their enduring presence over time in literature. Pausanias' description of the carved figure of Caucon holding a lyre atop his tomb speaks to their tribal poetic literacy. Several scholars believed Pylian Caucones (Hdt. 4.148, 1.147, 5.65) brought Neleid legends and Nestor's polemic exhortations to Colophon. Mimnermus (fr. 9, 14–15, Strabo 14.1.3–4) their ancestor extended the traditional royal "we" of Homeric Nestor in his words of inspiration to Smyrnaeans fighting Lydian Gyges in the Hermus plain (Paus. 4.21.2, quoted by Theoclus, Paus. 5.8.7, 9.29.4).

== Greek accounts ==
Strabo (8.3.14–15) in discussing Triphylian Pylos lists Caucones once inhabiting Lepreion, a settlement that may have had custody over Hades-Demeter shrines at Mt. Minthe that grew mint used for the kukeiôn at Eleusis (Homer, Hymn to Demeter 209: glêkhôni), as does Pausanias (5.5.5). These Caucones enter history with their expulsion (Hdt.4.148) and dispersion to Athens (Paus. 2.18.7–8, 7.2.1–5) and Ionian Miletos (Hdt. 1.146-7), after contributing to the spread of the Eleusinian Great Goddesses into Messenia and Thebes (Paus.4.1.5–9), Ephesos and Kolophon (Strabo 14.1.3). With these passages Pausanias affirms Herodotus (2.51) on the spread of Hermes and a cult of Kabeiroi throughout Attica under Hipparchus between 528–514 BC employing inscribed square-cut figures of Hermes in marble as road markers (Plato, Hipparchus 228b–229b). A Caucon priest Methapus had done much the same at Thebes. The Milesian Caucones, according to Herodotus (1.147), possessed ancestry from Pylian Codrus, son of Melanthos, the very same genealogy Herodotus (5.65) assigns to the Athenian tyrant Peisistratos. Strabo (12.3.5) reported Caucones once inhabiting the southern Black Sea coast from Heraclea Pontica (modern Karadeniz Ereğli) to Carambis promontory at Teion, on the Parthenios River, their likely Homeric geography (Iliad 20.328–9).
