= Acroreia =

Mountainous district of ancient Elis

Acroreia

Acroreia or Akroreia (Ancient Greek: Ἀκρώρεια) was a mountainous district of ancient Elis on the borders of Arcadia, in which the rivers Peneius and Ladon take their rise. The inhabitants of the district were called Acrocreii (Ἀκρωρεῖοι), and their towns appear to have been Thraustus, Alium, Opus, and Eupagium, to which Lasion may be added. The name is used in opposition to Κοίλη or Hollow Elis. Diodorus Siculus writes that the Spartans, under command of Pausanias of Sparta, marched against Elis with 4,000 men in 402 BCE, and that the towns of Opus, Alium, Eupagium, Thraustus, and Lasion were subdued. Xenophon mentions an Arcadian raid into Elis and took several towns of Acroreia around 365 BCE. Stephanus of Byzantium, who is followed by many modern writers, makes Acrocreii a town, and places it in Triphylia; but this error appears to have arisen from confounding the Acrocreii with the Paroreatae in Triphylia.
