= Lepreum =

City-state in Ancient Greece

Coordinates: 37°26′24″N 21°43′29″E

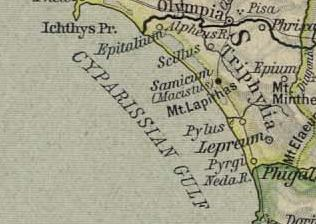
Map of Lepreum and the surrounding area

Lepreum or Lepreon (Ancient Greek: Λέπρεον), alternately named Lepreus or Lepreos (Λέπρεος) was an Ancient Greek city-state in Triphylia, a district of Elis (now part of the Elis regional unit). It was located 40 stadia away from the sea at the west end of Mount Minthi and built around two citadels (one at Agios Dimitrios, one at Phyrcus). Surrounded by an abundance of natural resources, Lepreum became an important city in the Classical and Hellenistic ages where it became the capital of the Triphylia region. The city has also been identified by some scholars as the mythical city of Aepy, a city described by Homer in the Iliad but never discovered. The ruins of ancient Lepreum have been excavated near the present village Lepreo.

== Name ==
Its name derived from Leprea (daughter of Pyrgeus) or from Lepreus.

== Mythology and Proto-History ==
Lepreon was the chief town of Triphylia, which is said to have been originally inhabited by the Caucones, whence Lepreon is called by Callimachus Καυκώνων πτολίεθον "fortified city of the Caukones". The Caucones were afterwards expelled by the Minyans, who founded Lepreon, which one of six cities (along with Makistos, Phrixa, Purgoi, Epeion, and Noudion) founded by the Minyans in the territory of the Caucones.

== History ==
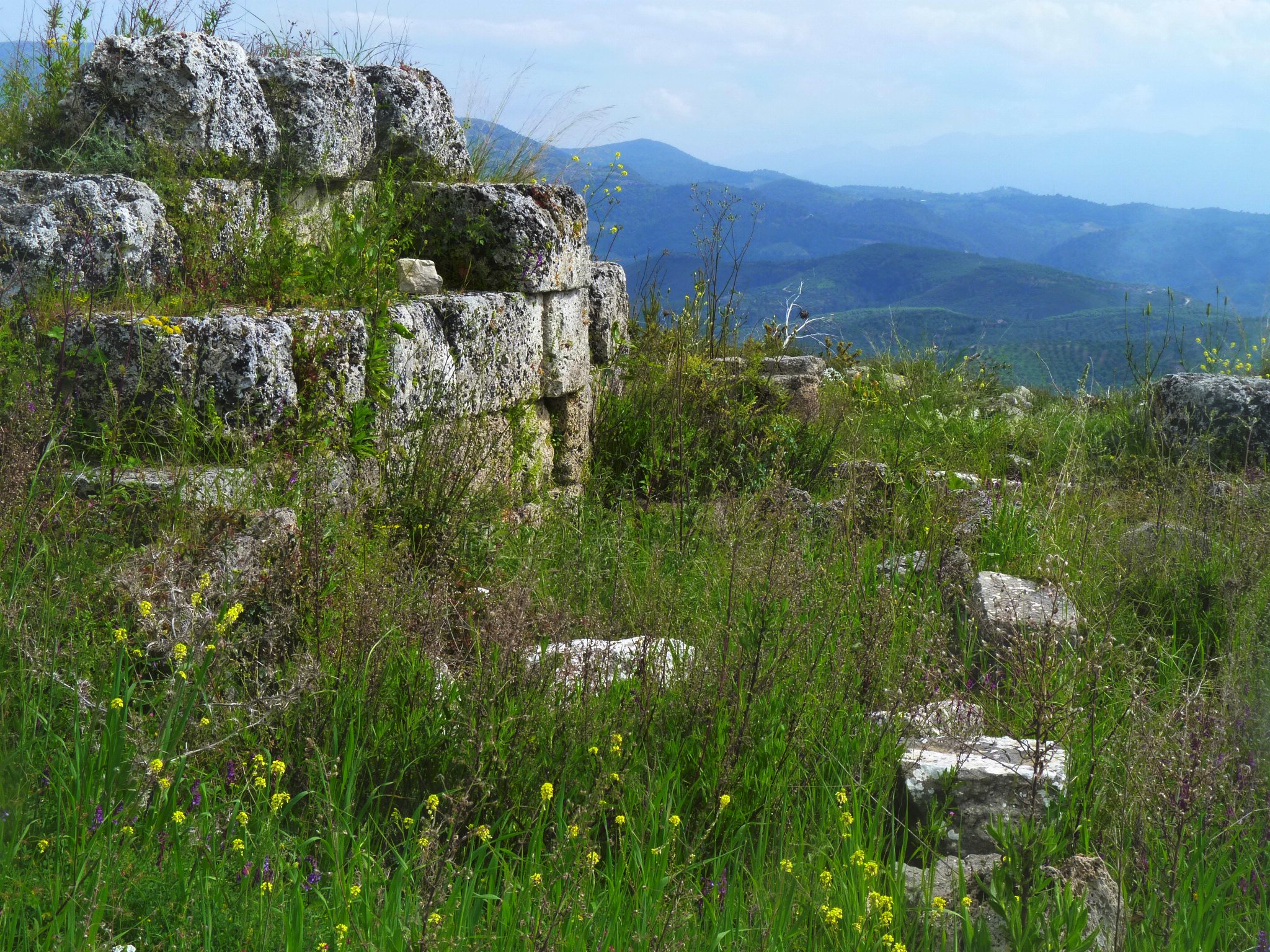
The ruins of the temple of Demeter.

The earliest traces of habitation in the area are from the Neolithic, with the inhabitants exploiting the area's natural resources and evidence of ties with the Aegean civilizations. It was the site of a grove sacred to Dione (Διώνη Diṓnē, from earlier *Διϝωνᾱ Diwōnā "she of Dyeus").

Shortly after the establishment of the city and following the First Messenian War, Lepreon and the rest of the Triphylia region were subdued by the Eleians, who governed them as subject places. The Triphylian cities, however, always bore this yoke with impatience; and Lepreum took the lead in their frequent attempts to shake off the Eleian supremacy. The greater importance of Lepreum is shown by the fact that it was the only one of the Triphylian towns which took part in the Greco-Persian Wars. In 421 BC, Lepreum and the other cities of Triphylia revolted against the Eleians with the assistance of Sparta, with the Eleians accepting Triphylian independence in 400 BC. With the weakening of Spartan power by their loss at the Battle of Leuctra in 371 BC the Spartans attempted to gain supremacy over Tryphilia, who responded by joining the recently established Arcadian League for defence. Hence, Lepreum is called an Arcadian town by Pliny the Elder, and Pausanias states the townsfolk claimed to be Arcadians in his time, though he notes that they had been subject to Eleians from ancient times and that Aristophanes described the town as Eleian.

During the Classical and Hellenistic ages Lepreum became the leading city of the Triphylia region, and was called a "blessed country" by Strabo; It controlled an area of high fertility, had both a good defensive position and mild climate thanks to the surrounding mountains and had easy access to both the Neda River and the sea. Due to its position in control of the roads linking Elis with Arcadia and Messenia, Lepreum was the de facto capital of Triphylia and was the only city in Triphylia to send troops to the Battle of Plataea during the Greco-Persian Wars. A temple dedicated to Demeter was built during the classical period in the Acropolis and parts of it still stand today.

After the time of Alexander the Great, the Eleians again reduced the Triphylian cities, which therefore were obliged to join the Aetolian League along with the Eleians. But when Philip V of Macedon, in his war with the Aetolians, marched into Triphylia, the inhabitants of Lepreum rose against the Eleian garrison in their town, and declared in favour of Philip, who thus obtained possession of the place.

By 170 AD, when visited by Pausanias, the city had lost much of its power and influence, although it was still considered the capital of Triphylia. The city was finally abandoned between 800 and 1000 after a series of raids by pirates and barbarians.

== Olympian raid ==
The ancient Greek Olympics were a time of inter-city sporting competition, and as such an Olympic truce was maintained in which, during the Olympic games, any attacks by participant cities on other participant cities were forbidden. At one set of games, however, the fortress at Phyrcus was attacked by Spartan forces, who were subsequently fined 200,000 drachmas, a heavy fine in a period where the average wage of a skilled worker was 1 drachma a day.

== Architectural style ==
The early buildings in the city were built on a foundation of limestone and porous bedrock, with walls of mud bricks. The buildings were orientated on a north-south line, with doors on the north side to avoid the strong south winds.

== Founding myths ==
Lepreus, son of Pyrgeus (who was killed by Heracles) is considered by some to be the city's mythical founder, similar to the founding of Rome by Romulus and Remus. Other historians however assert that the city's name comes from the fact that the original settlers were afflicted with leprosy, while some claim that it was due to the presence of a temple of Zeus Leukaios (Of the White Poplar).

== See also ==
- List of ancient Greek cities
