= Margana (Elis) =

Town in the Pisatis in ancient Elis

Margana (Ancient Greek: Μάργανα) or Margalae or Margalai (Μαργάλαι) or Margaea or Margaia (Μάργαια) was a town in the Pisatis in ancient Elis, in the territory of Amphidolia, was supposed by some to be the Homeric Aepy. The Eleians were obliged to renounce their supremacy over it by the treaty which they made with Sparta in 400 BCE, on which occasion it is called one of the Triphylian towns. It is mentioned as one of the towns taken by the Arcadians in their war with the Eleians in 366 BCE.

Margana's site has not been located.
