= Pausanias (king of Sparta) =

King of Sparta in 445–426 and 408–395 BC

King of Sparta
- Reign: 445–426 BC; 408–395 BC
- Predecessor: Pleistoanax
- Successor: Agesipolis I
- Co-ruler: Archidamus II, Agis II
- Died: After 380 BC
- Issue: Agesipolis I; Cleombrotus I
- Greek: Παυσανίας
- Dynasty: Agiad

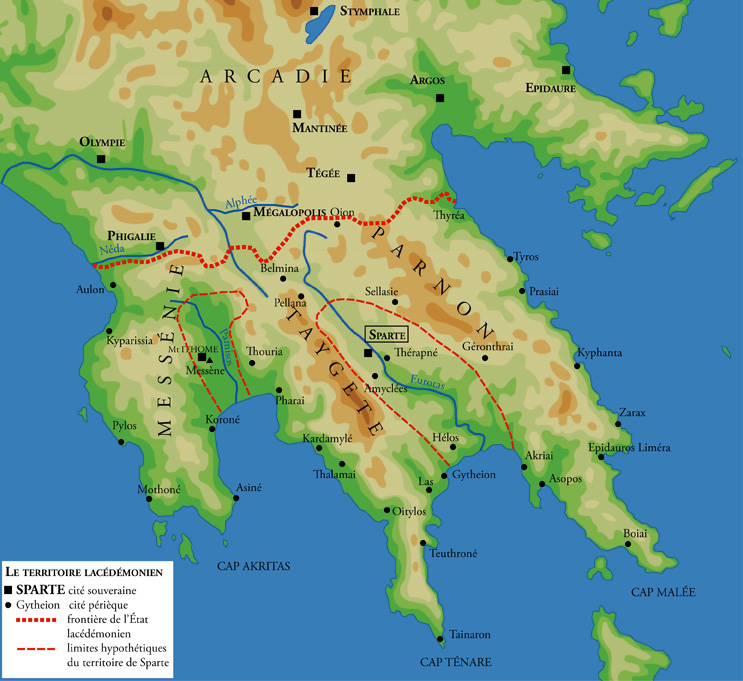
Sparta in Ancient Greece

Pausanias (Ancient Greek: Παυσανίας) was the Agiad King of Sparta; the son of Pleistoanax. He ruled Sparta from 445 BC to 427 BC and again from 409 BC to 395 BC. He was the leader of the faction in Sparta that opposed the imperialist policy conducted by Lysander.

Pausanias became king in 445 BC, when his father Pleistoanax was forced into exile because he made a peace settlement with Athens, which was deemed dishonourable in Sparta. Too young to reign, his uncle Cleomenes acted as regent. Pleistoanax then returned in 427 BC and resumed his reign. Pausanias effectively became king in 409, at the death of his father. As he continued the conciliatory policy with Athens favoured by Pleistoanax, Pausanias clashed with Lysander, the Spartan general who had won the Peloponnesian War against Athens in 404 BC and supported an imperialist policy in the Aegean Sea. In 403 BC, Pausanias engineered the restoration of the Athenian democracy, which had been replaced by the regime of the Thirty Tyrants installed by Lysander after his victory. The latter's supporters and the other king Agis II attempted a prosecution for betrayal against Pausanias, who narrowly escaped condemnation.

In 395 BC, Lysander died fighting against Thebes at the beginning of the Corinthian War. Pausanias was again prosecuted by Lysander's friends, who accused him of having delayed his army to avoid supporting Lysander. This time, Pausanias was sentenced to death and had to go into exile in Tegea. He composed there a political treatise dealing with the Spartan constitution and Lycurgus, the mythical legislator of Sparta.

== First reign (c. 445–427 BC) ==
Pausanias belonged to the Agiad dynasty and was the son of king Pleistoanax, born during a period of conflict against the other Spartan authorities and the Eurypontids—the other Spartan dynasty. His father was forced to go into exile after his first military campaign against Athens in 445 because he was accused of having taken a bribe from Pericles and offered him a lenient peace as a result. Pausanias was probably born around this time, perhaps even after his father's exile. The choice of his name is significant, as Pleistoanax gave him the name of his own father Pausanias the Regent, who was starved to death by the ephors in the temple of Athena in Sparta; thus showing Pleistoanax's defiance against the Spartan government.

The regency for Pausanias was assumed by his uncle Cleomenes, second son of Pausanias the Regent. This period was dominated by the Eurypontid king Archidamus II, who prevented Pleistoanax from returning to Sparta, while Pausanias could not oppose him as a child. Pleistoanax could only return in 427, after the death of Archidamus; he recovered his former position, with Pausanias as prince. During his second reign, Pleistoanax was the leader of the Peace faction in Sparta, in favour of negotiating a settlement with Athens to end the Peloponnesian War (ongoing since 431). His efforts were rewarded with the Peace of Nicias in 421, which nevertheless had only a short life. Pleistoanax finally died in 408 and Pausanias became king again; this time in full capacity.

== Second reign (409–395 BC) ==
The later part of the Peloponnesian War was dominated by Lysander, a talented general from the entourage of the Eurypontids. Thanks to his naval victories against Athens in the Aegean Sea, Lysander built a network of friendships with puppet oligarchies and the Persian prince Cyrus, which even overshadowed the Spartan kings. In 406, Pausanias likely supported the candidacy of Callicratidas to replace Lysander as navarch (commander of the navy), but the latter sabotaged the position of his successor, which led to the defeat of Arginusae and Lysander's return to command the following year.

=== Restoration of the Athenian democracy (405–403 BC) ===
Pausanias' first known command was in Autumn 405, when he led the main force of the Peloponnesian League to besiege Athens, although Agis was already in Attica, at the head of the garrison of Decelea, a stronghold occupied by Sparta since 415. Perhaps Pausanias refused to let Agis command the army because of the century-long enmity between the kings. Athens nevertheless refused to submit and Pausanias returned to Sparta with the army. The Peloponnesian War ended the following year after Lysander negotiated the Athenian surrender, notably with Theramenes, and installed a pro-Spartan oligarchy, known as the Thirty Tyrants, as he had done in Athens' former allied cities when he captured them. This regime was rapidly challenged by the Athenian democratic resistance led by Thrasybulus, who captured the Piraeus harbour in 403; the Thirty then retreated to the city of Eleusis in western Attica. Sparta initially made a loan of 100 talents to the Thirty (to hire mercenaries), while Lysander went to Eleusis and his brother Libys as navarch blockaded Piraeus.

Whereas the crushing of the Athenian democrats appeared imminent, Pausanias brought a drastic change in Sparta. In July 403, he convinced a majority of three ephors (out of five) and Agis II to lead the Peloponnesian army to Attica to put Lysander in check. Only one ephor's name is known: Nausikleidas, who also followed Pausanias in Attica. Pausanias initially disguised his real intentions and commanded the army with the official purpose of helping the Thirty. Thebans and Corinthians consequently refused to join his expedition, as they believed he was going to make Athens a Spartan possession. Once in Attica, Pausanias relieved Lysander from his command, then fought a small battle against the Athenian Democrats commanded by Thrasybulus. Soon after, Pausanias opened negotiations with the Democrats and advised them to send an official embassy to Sparta. After they heard the Athenian ambassadors, the Spartan ekklesia and the ephors sent a 15-man commission to Attica in order to assist Pausanias to conclude a settlement. Pausanias therefore applied his plan: he granted Athens full internal autonomy, restored the democracy, removed the Spartan garrison from Athens, pronounced a general amnesty among Athenians, while Athens joined the Peloponnesian League. This settlement completely overturned Lysander's policy since the end of the Peloponnesian War, since Lysander's oligarchies in the other Greek cities were probably removed at the same time. Out of gratitude for Pausanias, the Athenians built a large monument for the Spartans who died in the earlier skirmishes against the Democrats. It was located on the Sacred Way, just outside the Dipylon.

The main source for the events, Xenophon, tells that Pausanias acted against Lysander because he was jealous of his power. However, Pausanias was probably more concerned by the growing anger expressed by Sparta's allies against Lysander's aggressive imperialism, and wanted instead to return to Sparta's traditional foreign policy of isolationism abroad and conservatism at home. Lysander and his friends, such as Gylippus, also brought some of wealth they had amassed during the war against Athens, which provoked resentment in Sparta, likely led by Pausanias.

=== First trial (403 BC) ===
On his return to Sparta from Athens, Pausanias was prosecuted for betrayal before a supreme court made of the Gerousia (composed of 28 gerontes and the two kings) and the five ephors. Although he had worked with Pausanias to bring Lysander down, the initiative of the trial came from Agis II, with the obvious encouragement of Lysander's friends. The cause of Agis' shifting behaviour has long been debated by modern historians. Perhaps he only supported Pausanias to reduce Lysander's dangerous power, but then returned to the traditional rivalry between the two royal houses; Agis additionally supported the "hard-line" against Athens. The breakdown of the Gerousia's final vote is known (an exceptional occurrence in Spartan history): the 28 gerontes were evenly divided, but Agis cast his vote against his colleague. Pausanias was nonetheless saved by the ephors, who unanimously voted in his favour, but the reason behind this support is unknown. They presumably agreed with Pausanias' settlement that allowed Sparta to control Athens without intervening too much in its affairs.

Following his trial, Pausanias disappears from the sources until 396, probably because he disapproved Sparta's renewed imperialist policy conducted by the Eurypontids, Agis and his successor Agesilaus II, notably against Elis, Thessaly, and the expedition against the Persian Empire.

=== Campaign against Elis (c. 401 BC) ===
The author Diodorus Siculus, alone of all extant sources, assigns Pausanias the leadership of a campaign against Elis in 401. With levies from all of Sparta's allies except Corinth and Thebes, Pausanias invaded Eleia through Arcadia, taking the border fort of Lasion, winning over four communities in Acroreia, and seizing Pylus. He then besieged Elis itself, but a successful sortie by the Eleans and some picked Aetolian mercenaries prompted him to ravage the countryside instead. Soon afterwards, Pausanias retired to Dyme in Achaea for the winter, while his troops were garrisoned in forts he had built in Elean territory.

Some authorities have been tempted to reject this entire sequence of events because the main source for the Elean war, Xenophon, narrates two campaigns instead of one and attributes the leadership of both to the other king, Agis. Others insist that Diodorus, who for own part omits any mention of Agis, preserves authentic material. Ron Unz, who accepts the role of Pausanias, additionally suggests that it was Pausanias who led the subsequent Spartan attack on Naupactus, just across the Gulf of Corinth from his winter quarters at Dyme, to expel the Messenians which had been settled there by Athens decades before.

=== Corinthian War (395 BC) ===
Returning to Sparta in 395 BC, Lysander was instrumental in starting a war with Thebes and other Greek cities, which came to be known as the Corinthian War. The Spartans prepared to send out an army against this new alliance of Athens, Thebes, Corinth and Argos (with the backing of the Persians).

The Spartans arranged for two armies, one under Lysander and the other under Pausanias, to rendezvous at and attack the city of Haliartus, Boeotia. Lysander arrived at the city while Pausanias's forces were still several days away. Not willing to wait for Pausanias, Lysander advanced to Haliartus with his troops. In the ensuing Battle of Haliartus, Lysander was killed after bringing his forces too near the walls of the city. Pausanias's army arrived after Lysander's defeat but then left the battle scene primarily due to Athenian military opposition. King Pausanias negotiated a cease of fighting so the bodies of the dead were able to be collected for a proper burial. After, the Spartan army returned to Sparta.

=== Second trial (395 BC) ===
Because of his poor leadership at Haliartus, Pausanias was condemned to death by the Spartans and replaced as king by his young son Agesipolis I.

However, Pausanias was able to escape execution and fled Sparta to live in exile in Tegea.

== Exile ==
In exile, Pausanias wrote a logos, a pamphlet on Lycurgus and the Spartan constitution. Writing was a very unusual activity for a Spartan king at the time, but another contemporary Spartan named Thibron, perhaps the general known in the 390s, also composed a treaty on a similar topic. Pausanias' text is lost, and its only mention in ancient sources comes from a corrupted passage in Strabo's Geographica, written in the time of Augustus. The main point of his pamphlet seems to have been a call for the abolition of the ephors, and returning to the ancestral constitution of Sparta designed by the legendary, or perhaps mythical, lawgiver Lycurgus. Modern scholars suggest that Pausanias argued that the ephorate was not founded by Lycurgus, as it had hitherto been assumed by the Spartans, because Aristotle (384–322) in the Politics wrote that it was created by king Theopompus in the 8th century. This change of thought was perhaps due to the authority of Pausanias' logos. Pausanias therefore had a significant influence on the idealisation of Lycurgus in Sparta, which culminated in the 3rd century, when the revolutionary kings Agis IV and Cleomenes III claimed to base their reforms on Lycurgus.

Pausanias is believed to have outlived his son, Agesipolis I, according to an inscription found on a monument set up by Pausanias to the memory of his son in Delphi.

The year of Pausanias's death is sometime after 380 BC. He was also the father of Cleombrotus I.

== Bibliography ==
- Paul Cartledge, Agesilaos and the Crisis of Sparta, Baltimore, Johns Hopkins University Press, 1987. ISBN 978-0-7156-3032-7
- ——, Sparta and Lakonia, A Regional History 1300–362 BC, London, Routledge, 2002 (originally published in 1979). ISBN 0-415-26276-3
- ——, "Spartan justice? or the 'state of the ephors'?", Dike, n°3, 2000, p. 14.
- Charles D. Hamilton, Sparta's Bitter Victories: Politics and Diplomacy in the Corinthian War, Ithaca, Cornell University Press, 1979. ISBN 978-0-8014-1158-8
- Donald Kagan, The Outbreak of the Peloponnesian War, Ithaca/London, Cornell University Press, 1969. ISBN 0-8014-9556-3
- ——, The Archidamian War, Ithaca, Cornell University Press, 1974.
- ——, The Peace of Nicias and the Sicilian Expedition, Ithaca, Cornell University Press, 1981.
- D. M. Lewis, John Boardman, Simon Hornblower, M. Ostwald (editors), The Cambridge Ancient History, vol. VI, The Fourth Century B.C., Cambridge University Press, 1994. ISBN 0-521-23348-8
- John Marr, "What Did the Athenians Demand in 432 B.C.?", Phoenix, Vol. 52, No. 1/2 (Spring–Summer, 1998), pp. 120–124.
- Paul Poralla & Alfred S. Bradford, Prosopographie der Lakedaimonier, bis auf die Zeit Alexanders des Grossen, Chicago, 1985 (originally published in 1913). OCLC 1151065049
- Anton Powell (editor), A Companion to Sparta, Hoboken, Wiley, 2018. ISBN 978-1-4051-8869-2
- Paul A. Rahe, Sparta's First Attic War, The Grand Strategy of Classical Sparta, 478–446 B.C., New Haven, Yale University Press, 2019. ISBN 978-0-300-24261-4
- Roy, Jim (2009). "The Spartan–Elean War of c. 400". Athenaeum. 97. University of Pavia: 69–86. ISSN 0004-6574.
- G. E. M. de Ste. Croix, The Origins of the Peloponnesian War, London, Duckworth, 1972. ISBN 0-7156-0640-9
- Unz, Ron K. (1986). "The Chronology of the Elean War". Greek, Roman, and Byzantine Studies. 27 (1): 29–42. ISSN 0017-3916.
- Mary E. White, "Some Agiad Dates: Pausanias and His Sons", The Journal of Hellenic Studies, Vol. 84 (1964), pp. 140–152.

Preceded by Pleistoanax	Agiad King of Sparta; 445–426 BC and 408–395 BC	Succeeded by Agesipolis I
