= Lasion =

Coordinates: 37°47′53″N 21°44′36″E

Lasion (Greek: Λασίων or Λασιών) was the chief town of the mountainous district of Acroreia in ancient Elis proper, situated upon the frontiers of Arcadia near Psophis. Lasion was a frequent object of dispute between the Arcadians and Eleians, both of whom laid claim to it. In the war which the Spartans carried on against Elis at the close of the Peloponnesian War, Pausanias, king of Sparta, took Lasion. The invasion of Pausanias is not mentioned by Xenophon in his account of this war; but the latter author relates that, by the treaty of peace concluded between Elis and Sparta in 400 BCE, the Eleians were obliged to give up Lasion, in consequence of its being claimed by the Arcadians. In 366 BCE, the Eleians attempted to recover Lasion from the Arcadians; they took the town by surprise, but were shortly afterwards driven out of it again by the Arcadians. In 219 BCE, Lasion was again a fortress of Elis, but upon the capture of Psophis by Philip V of Macedon, the Eleian garrison at Lasion straightway deserted the place; after Philip took the town, he gave it to the Achaeans. Polybius mentions along with Lasion a fortress called Pyrgus, which he places in a district named Perippia.

It is located in the upper Ladon valley, north of modern Koumani.
