= Triphylia =

Ancient tribal region of southwest Greece

Triphylia

Triphylia (Greek: Τριφυλία, Trifylia, "the country of the three tribes") was an area of the ancient Peloponnese between the rivers Neda in the south and the Alpheios in the north. Strabo and Pausanias both describe Triphylia as part of Elis, and it fell at times under the domination of the city of Elis, but Pausanias claims that the residents reckoned themselves Arcadian, not Elean. They fell under the rule of Elis in the 8th century BC, and remained under Elean rule until the Spartans asserted their control in 402 BC. When the Spartans were defeated by the Thebans at the Battle of Leuctra in 371 BC, the Eleans attempted to reassert their control, but the Triphylians, in order to maintain their independence from Elis, joined the Arcadian League in 368 BC. In this period, their political fortunes were often shared by the areas on the border between Elis and Arcadia but to the north of the River Alpheus; Xenophon mentions the Amphidolians and Acrorians and the city-states of Lasion, Margana, and Letrini in this context. The Amphidolians, Marganians, and Letrinians are remarkable in Xenophon for fielding slingers for the Peloponnesian army.

The most important city in Triphylia was Lepreum, which maintained its self-government in the 5th century BC. In his accounts of wars between the Eleans and their enemies in Sparta and Arcadia in this period, Xenophon also mentions Scillus, Macistus, Epium, Phrixa, and Epitalium as cities in Triphylia.

== See also ==
- Bolax (Elis)
