= Ancient Elis =

City state in Ancient Greece

Elis Ἦλις
- Region of Ancient Greece
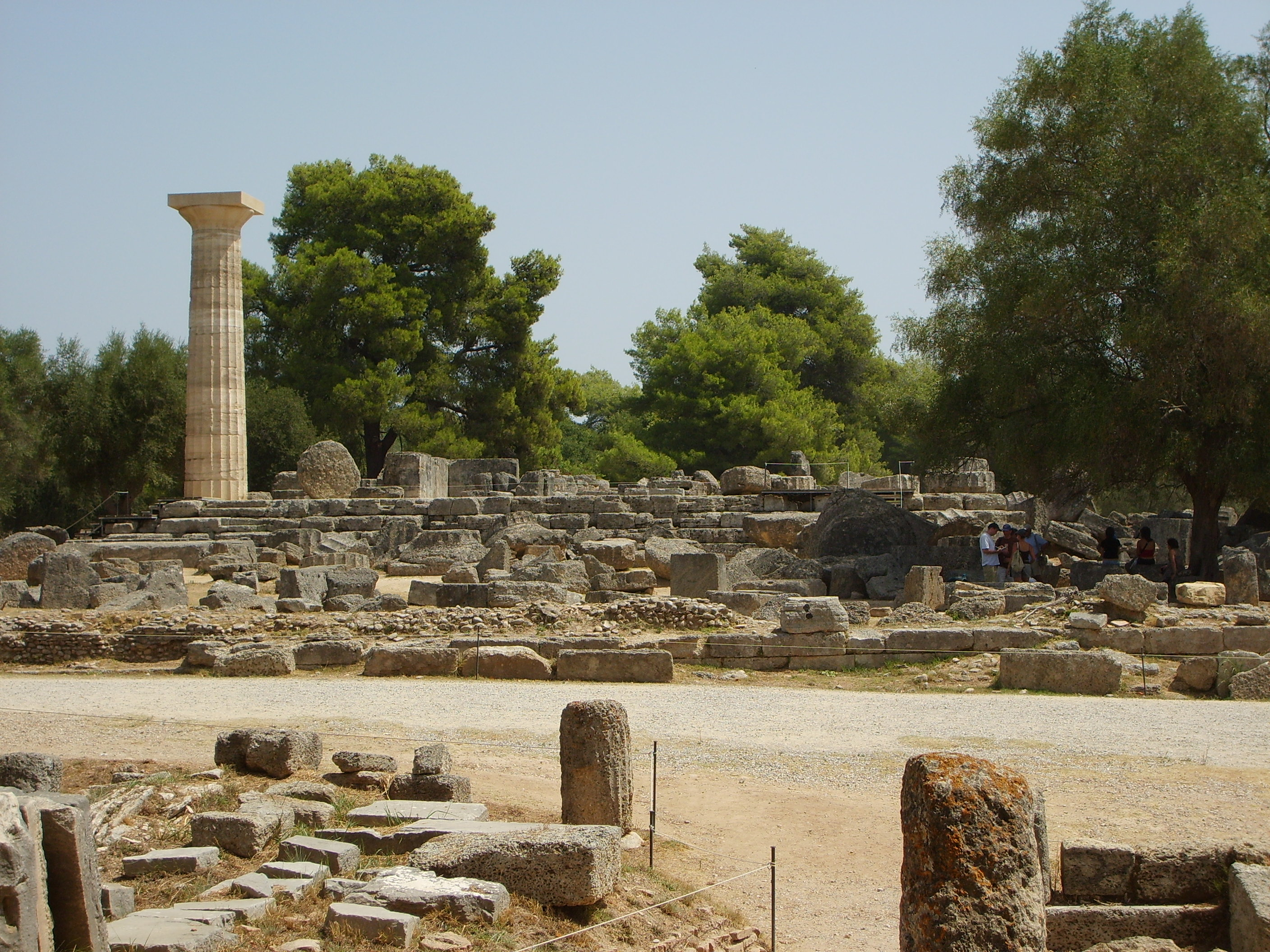
- Ruins of the Temple of Zeus, Olympia
- Interactive map of Elis
- Location: Peloponnese
- Major cities: Elis, Olympia
- Dialects: Northwest Greek

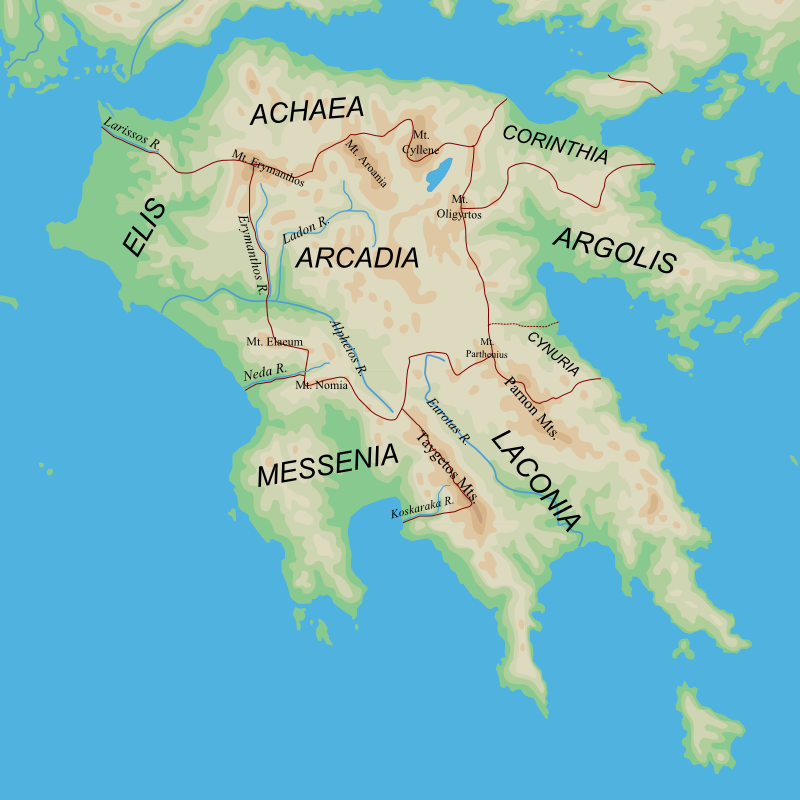
Ancient regions of Peloponnese (southern mainland Greece)

Elis (/ˈiːlɪs/) or Eleia (/ɪˈlaɪ.ə/; Attic Greek: Ἦλις, romanized: Ēlis [ɛ̂ːlis]; Elean: Ϝᾶλις [wâːlis]; Greek: Ήλιδα, romanized: Ilida) was an ancient polis (city-state) in the northwestern Peloponnese in Greece.

The polis included the sanctuary at Olympia where the Olympic games were organised by Elis over 1000 years, which was the main claim to fame of the city.

== Location ==
The polis was bounded to the northeast by Achaea, east by Arcadia, south by Messenia, and west by the Ionian Sea. It roughly corresponds to the modern regional unit of Elis.

The region is one of the most agriculturally fertile regions of the Peloponnese, a lowland with extensive plains watered by the Peneus, Alpheus and other rivers that flow down from the Arcadian highlands.

Elis was able to support herds of cattle and the raising of horses more than many other regions. The marshes on the coast were home to a unique form of flax used to produce the especially fine byssos linen and became a substantial cash crop in the Imperial period.

== History ==
Maximum extent of Elean territory (7th–4th centuries BC) Elis proper Pisatis Acroreia Triphylia Elis (4th–2nd centuries BC) Elis proper Pisatis Ceded to Arcadia Acroreia Triphylia

The Eleans traced their roots back to the mythical Dorian invasion.

=== Early history ===
The people of the region are mentioned by Homer for the first time under the title of Epeians (Epeii), as setting out for the Trojan War, and he described them as living in a state of constant hostility with their neighbours the Pylians. In the mythical Dorian invasion of the Peloponnese, Elis was assigned to Oxylus and the Aetolians. The dialect spoken in Elis in historical times was Dorian, which might indicate that there had been an influx of people from northwestern Greece. These people, amalgamating with the Epeians, formed a powerful kingdom in the north of Elis. Three independent groups developed in the region: the Epeians, Minyae and Eleans.

Before the end of the 8th century BC, the Eleans had vanquished the Minyae and Epeians. Over the archaic period, they expanded their control of the region through conquest and treaties, reducing many of the surrounding communities to perioeci (non-citizen dependent communities). The Eleans enjoyed the support of Sparta in this process. The sanctuary of Olympia and the Olympic games, which were re-established in 776 BC, were initially controlled by the city of Pisa, but Elis contested this. They gained control of the sanctuary and games around 576 BC and destroyed Pisa in 572 BC.

==== Districts ====
At its peak Elis consisted of four districts:

- Elis
- Acroreia (or Koilē Κοίλη "Hollow", Latinised Coele, Elis), or Lowland Elis
- Pisâtis (Πισᾶτις "[territory] of Pisa")
- Triphylia (Τριφυλία Triphūlía "Country of the Three Tribes").

Acroreia was the largest and most northern of the three and was famous during antiquity for its cattle and horses. Pisatis extended south from Acroreia to the right bank of the river Alpheios, and was divided into eight departments named after as many towns. Triphylia stretched south from the Alpheios to the river Neda.

=== Classical period ===
As an ally of Sparta, Elis joined the Peloponnesian League in the 6th century BC. Elis ostensibly supported the Greek side in the Persian Wars, but played no notable role in the conflict. In 472 BC, the literary sources report a revolution at Elis which established a democracy modelled on the Athenian one. This also entailed a synoecism, in which the various communities within the Elean orbit merged into a single political unit, with its capital Elis.

Elis annexed most of Triphylia in the mid-fifth century BC, except for Lepreum in the south. Sometime afterwards, Lepreum was conquered as well. Over the course of the archaic and classical periods, the city gradually gained control of much of the region of Elis, most probably through unequal treaties with other cities; many inhabitants of Elis were Perioeci—autonomous free non-citizens.

When the Peloponesian War broke out between Athens and Sparta in 431 BC, Elis sided at first with Sparta. But the city-state joined Argos and Athens in an alliance against Sparta in 421 BC due to Spartan support for the independence of Lepreum. The Eleans banned the Spartans from participating in the Olympic Games of 420 BC and defeated them in battle when they tried to participate anyway. The Eleans did not participate in the Battle of Mantinea in 418 BC, at which the Spartans definitively defeated the alliance. After the Peloponnesian War, Elis and Lepreum fought against Sparta in the Spartan-Elean War (402-400 BC) and in 402 BC the Spartans captured the region of Acroreia and later were victorious. As a result, in 399 BC, the Spartans forced the Eleans to rejoin the Peloponnesian League and made them give up Triphylia and the peroecic communities in Acroreia.

The Eleans attempted to re-establish their authority over these places after Thebes ended the Spartan hegemony at the Battle of Leuctra in 371 BC. They successfully retook the old peroecic communities in the north, but the newly established Arcadian League came to the assistance of the Triphylians in the south. After an oligarchic revolution in 365 BC, the Eleans launched a war with the Arcadians for the territory, which lasted until 363 BC. In the course of the war, the city of Elis was very nearly sacked by the Arcadians and the Eleans were forced to give up control of Olympia, but the Spartans came to their rescue and forced the Arcadians to withdraw. The territory of Triphylia was ceded to Arcadia.

==== Democracy in Elis ====
Eric W. Robinson has argued that Elis was a democracy by around 500 BC, on the basis of early inscriptions which suggest that the people (the dāmos) could make and change laws. The literary sources refer to a democratic revolution in 472 BC and imply that Elis continued to be democratic until 365, when an oligarchic faction took control. At some point in the mid-fourth century, democracy may have been restored; a narrow oligarchy was replaced by a new constitution designed by Phormio of Elis, a student of Plato. The classical democracy at Elis seems to have functioned mainly through a popular Assembly and a Council, the two main institutions of most poleis. The Council initially had 500 members, but grew to 600 members by the end of the fifth century BC. There was also a range of public officials such as the demiourgoi who regularly submitted to public audits.

=== Hellenistic period ===
During the Macedonian supremacy in Greece they sided with the victors, but refused to fight against their countrymen. After the death of Alexander the Great in 323 BC they renounced the Macedonian alliance. At a time when most of their Peloponnesian neighbours were joining together as part of the Achaian League, the Eleans chose to join the rival Aetolian League. In 245 BC, Elis and the Aetolians conquered Triphylia and Lasion, but they lost the territory again in 219 BC when they entered the Social War on the Aetolian side and were invaded by Philip V of Macedon. In 191 BC, Elis was forced to join the Achaian League and it remained a member until the league was disbanded by the Romans in 146 BC at the end of the Achaean War.

According to Polybius, Elis had an unusual agricultural economy for the Peloponnese in this period, which was characterised by large estates. These estates had large numbers of slave labourers and were particularly focussed on animal husbandry. The owners of these estates spent most of their time in residence and rarely visited the city of Elis, as a result of which the Eleans instituted a system of travelling judges to ensure these people had access to justice.

=== Roman empire ===
Elis was freed in 146 BC, following the Roman abolition of the Achaian League. The victorious Roman general Lucius Mummius made gifts to the Eleans at Olympia, but the territory was pillaged by Sulla in the 80s BC, and struggled during the Roman Republican civil wars.

The Olympic games declined in popularity in the first century BC, due to the unstable political situation, but in the Imperial period, they were patronised by the Roman emperors and maintained their position as the most prestigious - if not the best attended - of the Panhellenic games. The city was a member of the revived Achaian League, which used Olympia as a centre for displaying its own honorific monuments.

Like other parts of the Peloponnese, the number of rural settlements declined in the Imperial period, as small farms were consolidated into larger estates. The city of Elis and other surviving urban centres probably increased in size. The social elite remained stable until the third century AD. Many Elean elite families in this period had roots going back to the Hellenistic Period or earlier. From the late first century BC onwards, prominent families began to receive Roman citizenship. They often had connections and citizenship in other cities within the province of Achaia. Many Eleans held important positions in the revived Achaian League. A very few elite Elean individuals entered the overall Imperial elite, becoming equites. But this was rare and no Eleans are known to have risen to the status of senator.

The Olympic Games continued in the first stages of the conversion of the Roman Empire to Christianity, but were finally ended by Theodosius in 394 AD, two years before the utter destruction of the country by the Gothic invasion under Alaric I. According to Hierocles's Synecdemus, Elis was a bishopric in the 6th century AD, subject to the bishop of Corinth. From the 9th century, the region prospered as part of the theme of the Peloponnese, with bishoprics at Olenus and Moreas.

== City ==
The city of Elis (Ancient Greek: Ἦλις) was the capital of the city-state. It was located at the exit of the river Peneus from the mountains into the plain in the area of today's Ilida Municipality north of Kalyvia. It is said to have been founded in 471 BC by synoecism, however it is unclear what the ancient sources mean by this as the city already existed in the same place before and there were separate communities in the region of Elis before and after.

The first excavations in Elis were carried out from 1910 to 1914 by the Austrian Archaeological Institute under the direction of Otto Walter. From 1960 to 1981 the Archaeological Society of Athens carried out further excavations under the direction of Nikolaos Yalouris with Austrian participation. Some of the finds are exhibited in the local archaeological museum founded in 1981, for which a new building was built in 2003.

Built in the fourth century BC, the theatre had a capacity of 8,000 people; below it, Early Helladic, sub-Mycenaean and Protogeometric graves have been found.

== Notable Eleans ==
Athletes

- Coroebus of Elis, the first victor at the Olympic Games.
- Troilus of Elis, 4th century BC equestrian

In mythology

- Salmoneus, Aethlius, Pelops mythological kings of Elis
- Endymion
- Sons of Endymion:
  - Epeius
  - Aetolus
  - Paeon
- Augeas, king of Elis related to the Fifth Labour of Heracles
- Amphimachus, king of Elis and leader of Eleans in the Trojan War
- Thalpius, leader of Eleans in the Trojan War
- Oxylus, king of Elis

Intellectuals

- Alexinus (c. 339–265 BC), philosopher
- Hippias of Elis, Greek sophist
- Phaedo of Elis, founder of the Elean School
- Pyrrho, founder of the Pyrrhonist school of philosophy

== Language ==
Eleans were labelled as the greatest barbarians barbarotatoi by musician Stratonicus of Athens

And when he was once asked by some one who were the wickedest people, he said, "That in Pamphylia, the people of Phaselis were the worst; but that the Sidetae were the worst in the whole world." And when he was asked again, according to the account given by Hegesander, which were the greatest barbarians, the Boeotians or the Thessalians he said, "The Eleans."

In Hesychius (s.v. βαρβαρόφωνοι) and other ancient lexica, Eleans are also listed as barbarophones. Indeed, the North-West Doric dialect of Elis is, after the Aeolic dialects, one of the most difficult for the modern reader of epigraphic texts.
