= Spartan hegemony =

Spartan domination of parts of Greece (404–371 BC)

Spartan hegemony was the period of dominance by Sparta in Greek affairs from 404 to 371 BC. Even before this period, the polis of Sparta was the greatest military land power of classical Greek antiquity and governed, dominated or influenced the entire Peloponnese. The defeat of the Athenians and the Delian League in the Peloponnesian War in 431–404 BC resulted in a short-lived Spartan dominance of the southern Greek world from 404 to 371 BC. Due to their mistrust of others, Spartans discouraged the creation of records about their internal affairs. The only histories of Sparta are from the writings of Xenophon, Thucydides, Herodotus and Plutarch, none of whom were Spartans. Plutarch was writing several centuries after the period of Spartan hegemony had ceased. This creates difficulties in understanding the Spartan political system, which was distinct from any other Greek polis.

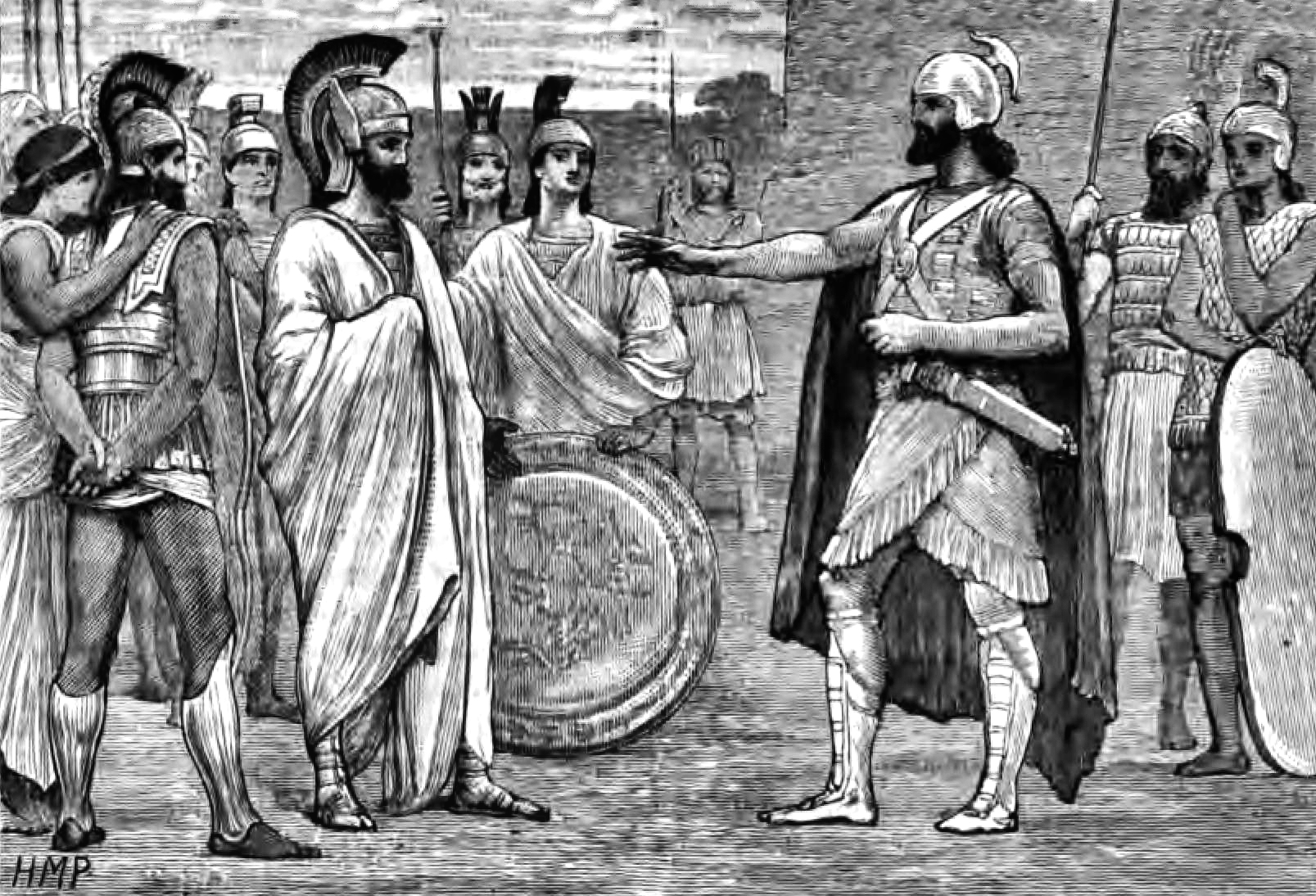
Meeting between Spartan king Agesilaus (left) and Pharnabazus II (right).

== History and rise to power ==
Map of Sparta

The Spartans had conquered the southern Peloponnese and incorporated the territory into the enlarged Sparta state. Spartan society functioned within three classes: homoioi or spartiates, perioeci, and the helots. The helots were captives of war and were state-owned slaves of Sparta. They powered the city-state's agrarian economy and were the work force. Additionally, the other class of working population in Spartan society were the perioeci, meaning "dwellers around", who were free peoples of conquered territories. The perioeci were allowed to maintain their own infrastructures, administrative arrangements and local economy, but had to pay tribute to Sparta and provide soldiers for the military. The homoioi were the citizens of Sparta. They were the elite class and were the only deserving of the title Spartan. As a result, the Spartan population was very small in comparison with the working classes. There was a ratio of 7 or 8 helots to every Spartan citizen. These three populations performed complementary functions that distinguished Sparta with a unique economic and social organization. While the helots and the perioeci were the workforce in agriculture and industry, the Spartans could devote themselves to training, maintaining, and operating the military. The reason for the continual strong military existence was to preserve order in Sparta and hold the large enslaved populations in check.

== Sparta's post Peloponnesian War regime ==
Lysander was the Spartan who after the end of the Peloponnesian War in 404 BC established many of the foreign pro-Spartan governments throughout the Aegean. He also established many Spartan garrisons. Most of the polis ruling systems he set up were ten man oligarchies called decarchies. Harmosts, Spartan military governors, were left as the head of the decarchies. As the men appointed were loyal to Lysander rather than Sparta, this system has been described as Lysander's private empire. In this establishment of a new Aegean order, many lost their lives or were exiled but on the other hand Aegina and Melos were restored to their former inhabitants.

Sparta was divided over what to do about Athens itself. Lysander and King Agis were for total destruction as were Sparta's leading allies Corinth and Thebes. However, a more moderate faction led by Pausanias gained the upper hand. Athens was spared but her long walls and the fortifications of Piraeus were demolished. Lysander did manage to insert the significant condition that Athens recall her exiles.

The return of the exiles to Athens contributed to the political instability of Athens allowing Lysander to establish shortly the oligarchy that has come to be known as Thirty Tyrants, composed of men beholden to him. The danger of so much power being in the hands of one person had become sufficiently clear that both King Agis and King Pausanias agreed that Lysander's influence needed to be curtailed. The decarchies were declared abolished and Athens quickly benefited when Sparta permitted democracy to be restored at Athens.

== Spartan campaigns in Asia Minor and Agesilaus ==
Agesilaus II was one of the two kings of Sparta during Sparta's hegemony. Plutarch later wrote that Agesilaus was a king of the traditional Spartan ideals, often seen wearing his traditional cloak which was threadbare. He began his kingship after the end of the Peloponnesian war after his brother Agis II died and was left without an heir (Agis’ son Leotychidas was rumored to be the illegitimate son of the Athenian Alcibiades). One of Agesilaus’ biggest supporters was the famous Spartan naval commander Lysander, who was previously Agesilaus’ erastēs, or mentor. According to the treaties signed in 412 and 411 between Sparta and the Persian Empire, the latter became the overlord of the Greek city-states of Asia Minor. In 401, these cities and Sparta supported the bid of Cyrus the Younger (the Persian Emperor's younger son and a good friend of Lysander) against his elder brother, the new emperor Artaxerxes II, who nevertheless defeated Cyrus at Cunaxa. As a result, Sparta remained at war with Artaxerxes, and supported the Greek cities of Asia, which fought against Tissaphernes, the satrap of Lydia and Caria.

=== The campaigns in Asia Minor ===
Thibron was sent out as harmost in 400 BC, with an army of about 5,000 men, composed of 1,000 Neodamodes (emancipated helots) and 4,000 other Peleponesians, to aid the Ionians against Tissaphernes, who wished to bring them into subjection. In addition to this force, Thibron recruited 2,000 local troops upon his arrival, but was initially unable to face the Persian army in the field. However, after he was joined by elements of the Ten Thousand, he was able to seize several cities. He then, according to Xenophon, settled in to besiege Larissa, but this proved fruitless, and Thibron was ordered to abandon it. Diodorus suggests that at some point, after taking Magnesia, Thibron attempted to conquer Tralles in Ionia, but was unsuccessful and returned to Magnesia. He is then said to have withdrawn to Ephesus after Tissaphernes arrived with a large force of cavalry. In any case, Thibron was recalled to Sparta and replaced by another general, Dercylidas, before he could launch his next campaign. Upon his return to Sparta Thibron was tried and exiled for allowing his troops to plunder Sparta's allies in the region.

From 399 BCE to 397 BCE, Dercylidas succeeded Thibron as commander of the army that was sent to support the Ionian Greeks against the Persians. Arriving in Asia-Minor he took command of Thibron's army and advanced against the cities of the Troad; he took the cities of Hamaxitus, Colonae, Arisba, Ilium and Cerbenia. After this he concluded an armistice of eight months with Pharnabazus, the Satrap of Hellespontine Phrygia, and fought a campaign against the Thracians of Bithynia.

After having ravaged the Bithynian countryside he took his force across the Dardanelles to Europe on the behest of the Greeks of the Chersonese who were under attack from the Thracians of Europe. Dercylidas drove the Thracian from the peninsula and closed it off by constructing a wall which ran from sea to sea. After receiving many gifts from the local Greeks, he transported his army back to Asia.

Pharnabazus and Tissaphernes, the Satrap of Ionia and Lydia recruited a large army of 20,000 infantry and 10,000 cavalry from their Satrapies and marched on Ephesus, Sparta's base of operations in Asia-Minor. Dercylidas marched out his 7,000-strong army to give battle, but instead of a battle a truce was concluded. After allying himself with Tissaphernes and Meidias, Dercylidas attacked Pharnabazus.

=== Agesilaus' campaign in Asia (396–394 BC) ===
In 397 Lysander engineered a large expedition in Asia headed by Agesilaus, likely to recover the influence he had over the Asian cities at the end of the Peloponnesian War. In order to win the approval of the Spartan assembly, Lysander built an army with only 30 Spartiates (full Spartan citizens), so the risk would be limited; the bulk of the army consisted of 2,000 neodamodes (freed helots) and 6,000 Greek allies. In addition, Agesilaus obtained the support of the oracles of Zeus at Olympia and Apollo at Delphi. Lysander and Agesilaus had intended the expedition to be a Panhellenic enterprise, but Athens, Corinth, and especially Thebes, refused to participate. In Spring 396, Agesilaus came to Aulis (in Boeotian territory) to sacrifice on the place where Agamemnon had done so just before his departure to Troy at the head of the Greek army in the Iliad, thus giving a grandiose aspect to the expedition. However he did not inform the Boeotians and brought his own seer to perform the sacrifice, instead of the local one. Learning this, the Boeotians prevented him from sacrificing and further humiliated him by casting away the victim; they perhaps intended to provoke a confrontation, as the relations between Sparta and Thebes had become execrable. Agesilaus then left to Asia, but Thebes remained hateful to him for the rest of his life.

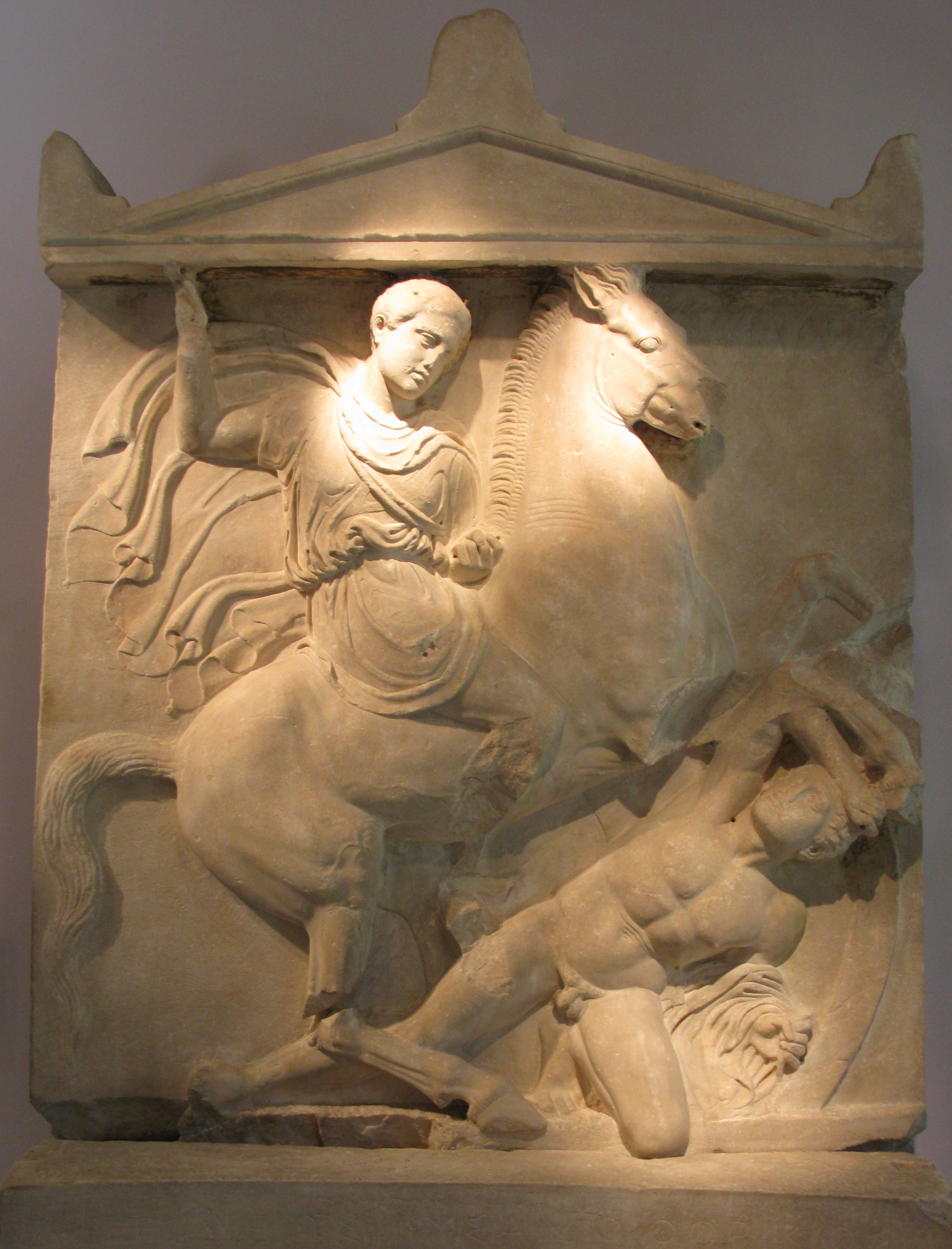
Athenian cavalryman Dexileos fighting a naked Peloponnesian hoplite in the Corinthian War. Dexileos was killed in action near Corinth in the summer of 394 BC, probably in the Battle of Nemea, or in a proximate engagement. Grave Stele of Dexileos, 394–393 BC.

After Thibron and Dercylidas' campaigns in Asia Minor, king Agesilaus succeeded as supreme commander of the Spartan forces in Asia-Minor to protect the allied Greek cities against the Achaemenid Empire. Once Agesilaus landed in Ephesus, the Spartan main base, he concluded a three months' truce with Tissaphernes, likely to settle the affairs among the Greek allies. He integrated some of the Greek mercenaries formerly hired by Cyrus the Younger (the Ten Thousand) in his army. They had returned from Persia under the leadership of Xenophon, who also remained in Agesilaus's staff. In Ephesus, Agesilaus's authority was nevertheless overshadowed by Lysander, who was reacquainted with many of his supporters, men he had placed in control of the Greek cities at the end of the Peloponnesian War. Angered by his local aura, Agesilaus humiliated Lysander several times to force him to leave the army, despite his former relationship and Lysander's role in his accession to the throne. Plutarch adds that after Agesilaus's emancipation from him, Lysander returned to his undercover scheme to make the monarchy elective.

After Lysander's departure, Agesilaus raided Phrygia, the satrapy of Pharnabazus, until his advance guard was defeated not far from Daskyleion by the superior Persian cavalry led by Bancaeus and Rathines. He then wintered at Ephesus, where he trained a cavalry force, perhaps on the advice of Xenophon, who had commanded the cavalry of the Ten Thousand. In 395, the Spartan king managed to trick Tissaphernes into thinking that he would attack Caria, in the south of Asia Minor, forcing the satrap to hold a defence line on the Meander river. Instead, Agesilaus moved north to the important city of Sardis. Tissaphernes hastened to meet the king there, but his cavalry sent in advance was defeated by Agesilaus's army. After his victory at the Battle of Sardis, Agesilaus became the first king to be given the command of both land and sea. He delegated the naval command to his brother-in-law Peisander, whom he appointed navarch despite his inexperience; perhaps Agesilaus wanted to avoid the rise of a new Lysander, who owed his prominence to his time as navarch. After his defeat, Tissaphernes was executed and replaced as satrap by Tithraustes, who gave Agesilaus 30 talents to move north to the satrapy of Pharnabazus (Persian satraps were often bitter rivals). Augesilaus's Phrygian campaign of 394 was fruitless, as he lacked the siege equipment required to take the fortresses of Leonton Kephalai, Gordion, and Miletou Teichos.

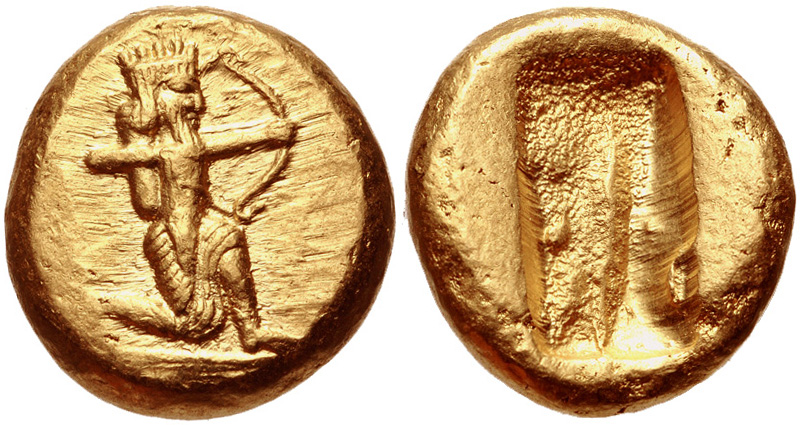
Tens of thousands of Darics (popularly called "archers"), the main currency in Persia, were used to bribe the Greek states to start a war against Sparta, so that Agesilaus would have to be recalled from Asia.

== Corinthian War and Agesilaus ==
He was unfortunately deterred by unpleasant news from Epicydidas that the mainland Greek poleis were starting war once again. This would later become known as the Corinthian War (395–387 BC) and featured an alliance between the Argives, Corinthians, Athenians and Thebans against Sparta. The Corinthian war took place between 395 and 386 BC.

In 391 BC, during the Corinthian War, Thibron and later Diphridas launched a number of successful raids into Persian Asia Minor. In Greece, the Spartans under Agesilaus met the numerous rebelling poleis. Among the most important battles that the Spartans fought in this war was that of Coronea, which was fought against a coalition of Greeks but especially the Thebans. The Spartans sought the aid of the Persians, asking them to cut off their support of the Thebans, Corinthians and Athenians. The resulting Peace of Antalcidas, named for the Spartan who negotiated it, was established in 386 BC and resulted in Sparta's loss of its Asian territories.

In 385 BC, the tyrant of Syracuse, Dionysius, wanted a friendly monarch in Epirus, so he sent 2,000 Greek hoplites and 500 suits of Greek armour to help the Illyrians, who at that time were led by king Bardylis, for their battles with the Molossians in Epirus. Attackers killed about 15,000 Molossians. Alcetas was restored to the throne, but the Illyrians didn't stop there. They continued pillaging throughout Epirus and parts of Greece. Dionysius joined them in an attempt to plunder the temple of Delphi. Then, Sparta, supported by Thessaly and Macedonians, intervened under Agesilaus, and expelled the Illyrians and the Syracusan warriors.

== The Boeotian War ==
In 382 BC the Theban citadel (the Cadmeia) was seized by the Spartans with the help of the pro-Spartan oligarchic supporters in the city. The oligarch Leontiades encouraged the general Phoebidas to seize the city when during a festival celebration. This being done, Leontiades defended Phoebidas' move in front of the Spartans, and persisted to arrest the democratic leader Ismenias and forced his aristocratic allies to run away from the city with hundreds of their supporters. Ismenias would later be executed by the Spartans on false charges during a show trial. Pelopidas and other leading Theban democrats fled to Athens where, years later, the Theban polemarch Leontiades sent assassins to prevent the exiles from returning; the assassins only managed to kill the democratic leader Androcleides. Pelopidas took the lead in a conspiracy to liberate Thebes by killing the oligarchs.

During the winter of 379/378 BC, a group of Theban exiles led by Pelopidas, Epaminondas, Melon, and other pro democracy allies were able to sneak into the city and, despite the 1500-strong Spartan garrison, succeed in liberating Thebes. During the next few years, Sparta mounted four expeditions against Thebes, which completely failed to bring Thebes to heel. In 375 BC, Sparta suffered a symbolically significant defeat at the hands of Thebes in the Battle of Tegyra. Finally, the Greek city-states attempted a peace on the mainland by sending diplomats to meet with Agesilaus in Sparta. Epaminondas, the Theban diplomat, angered Agesilaus by arguing for the freedom of the non-Spartans of Laconia. Agesilaus then struck the Thebans out of the treaty. The ensuing Battle of Leuctra in 371 BC marked the end of Spartan hegemony. Agesilaus himself did not fight at Leuctra so as not to appear too belligerent.

== Sparta after hegemony ==
During the Spartan hegemony in Athens there is evidence of criticism of democracy. A document in the 420s BC by a political writer known as the "Old Oligarch" demonstrates the anti-democratic sentiments in Athens. The "Old Oligarch's" political outlook is shaped by his belief that the economic classes were the source to political motivation; this view is a direct rejection of democracy's efforts to establish civil unity. The "Old Oligarch" argues that the polis by nature is a battlefield rather than a site of public dialogue because individuals side with their socio-economic rank. Yet, despite this anti-democratic feeling, democracy eventually returned to Athens after the expulsion of the Thirty Tyrants.

The importance of Sparta in politics largely drops off after Sparta's defeat at Leuctra. Following Agesilaus’ death in 360 BC, Archidamus III became king and practiced a policy of non-conflict between Athens and the Second Naval Confederacy (357–355 BC). Between 355 and 346 BC, they allied with Athens against Thebes and the Amphictyonic Council effectively pulling Theban attention away from the Peloponnese.

== See also ==
- Laconophilia
- Palingenesis
- Translatio imperii

== Modern sources ==
- Paul Cartledge, Sparta and Lakonia, A Regional History 1300–362 BC, London, Routledge, 1979 (originally published in 1979). ISBN 0-415-26276-3
- ——, Agesilaos and the Crisis of Sparta, Baltimore, Johns Hopkins University Press, 1987.
- Hamilton, Charles D. Agesilaus and the Failure of Spartan Hegemony. Ithaca, NY: Cornell University Press, 1991.
- Hamilton, Charles D. Sparta's Bitter Victories: Politics and Diplomacy in the Corinthian War. Ithaca, NY: Cornell University Press, 1979.
