= Battle of Sardis (395 BC) =

Spartan victory against the Achaemenid Empire

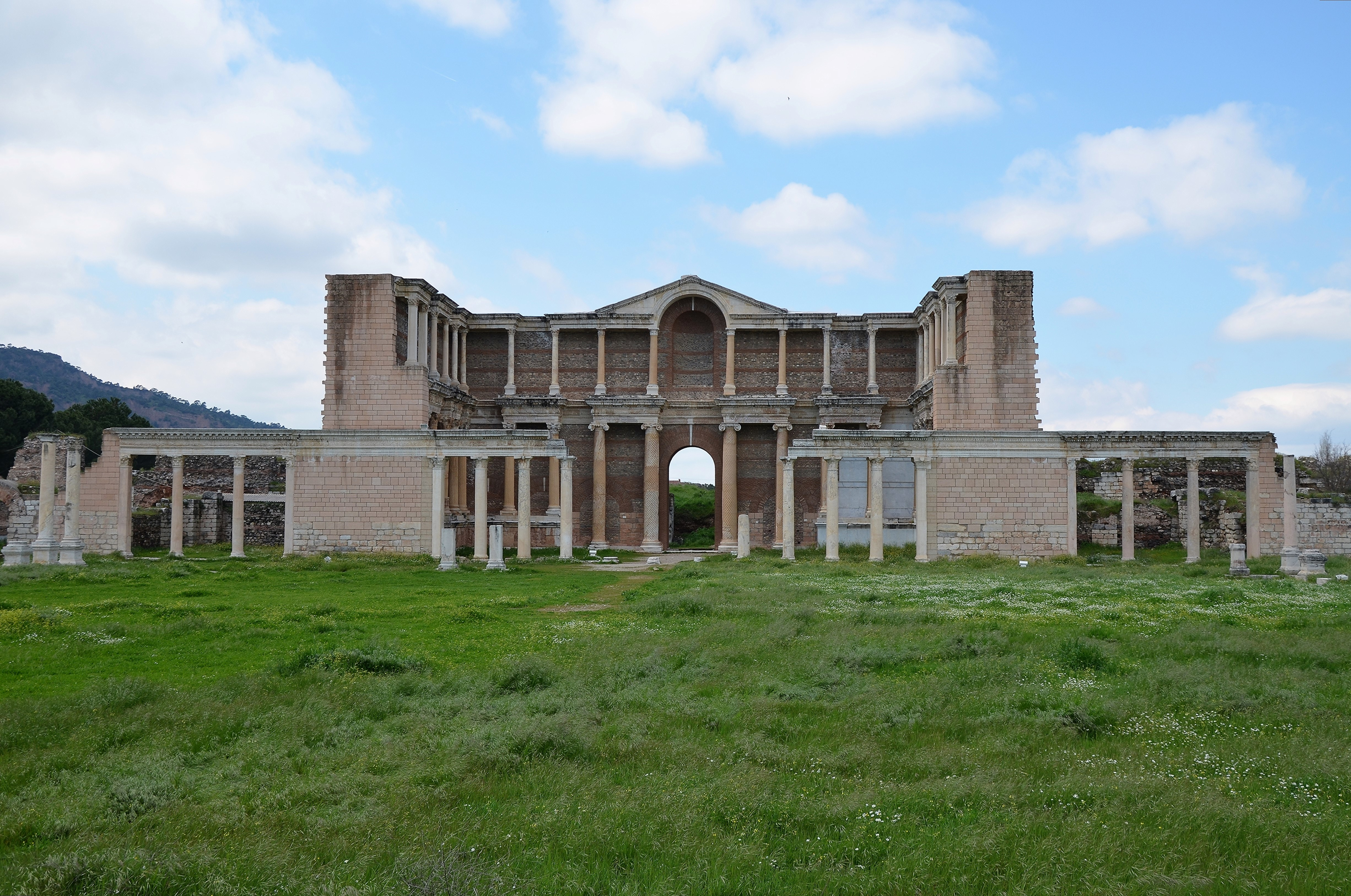
- The Greek gymnasium of Sardis
Date	395 BC
Location	Sardis, Lydia 38°29′18″N 28°02′25″E
Result	Spartan victory

Belligerents
Sparta	Achaemenid Empire

Commanders and leaders
Agesilaus II	(Achaemenid Empire) Tissaphernes

Strength
Unknown	Unknown

Casualties and losses
Unknown	Unknown

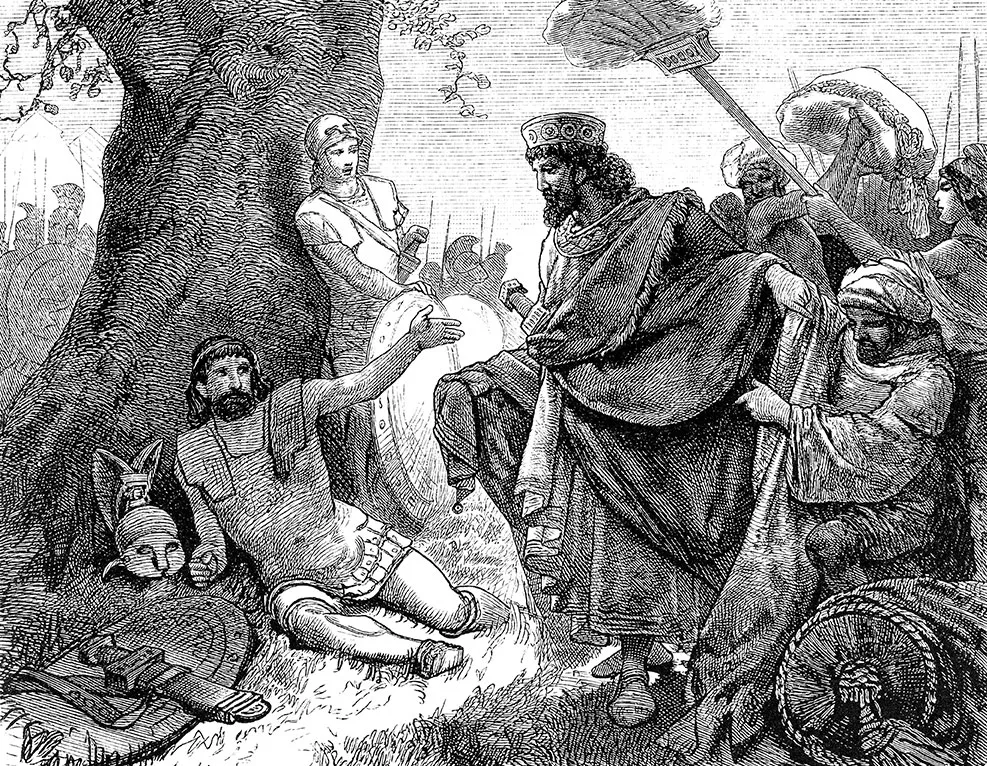
Agesilaus II Pharnabazus

The Battle of Sardis took place in 395 BC between Sparta and the Achaemenid Empire. The battle saw a confrontation between Spartan forces led by Agesilaus II and Persian troops commanded by Tissaphernes near the city of Sardis, the administrative center of Persian Asia Minor.

== Background ==
Following the end of the Peloponnesian War (404 BC), Sparta emerged as the dominant Greek power but soon faced widespread opposition due to its aggressive policies in Greece and Asia Minor. Seeking to curtail Persian influence in Ionia, Lysander, the famed Spartan admiral who had orchestrated Athens’ defeat in 404 BC, sought to rally Greek cities against Persia.

According to the treaties signed in 412 and 411 between Sparta and the Persian Empire, the latter became the overlord of the Greek city-states of Asia Minor. In 401, these cities and Sparta supported the bid of Cyrus the Younger (the Persian Emperor's younger son and a good friend of Lysander) against his elder brother, the new emperor Artaxerxes II, who nevertheless defeated Cyrus at Cunaxa. As a result, Sparta remained at war with Artaxerxes, and supported the Greek cities of Asia, which fought against Tissaphernes, the satrap of Lydia and Caria. In 397 Lysander engineered a large expedition in Asia headed by Agesilaus, likely to recover the influence he had over the Asian cities at the end of the Peloponnesian War. In order to win the approval of the Spartan assembly, Lysander built an army with only 30 Spartiates (full Spartan citizens), so the risk would be limited; the bulk of the army consisted of 2,000 neodamodes (freed helots) and 6,000 Greek allies. In addition, Agesilaus obtained the support of the oracles of Zeus at Olympia and Apollo at Delphi.

Once Agesilaus landed in Ephesus, the Spartan main base, he concluded a three months' truce with Tissaphernes, likely to settle the affairs among the Greek allies. He integrated some of the Greek mercenaries formerly hired by Cyrus the Younger (the Ten Thousand) in his army. They had returned from Persia under the leadership of Xenophon, who also remained in Agesilaus's staff. In Ephesus, Agesilaus's authority was nevertheless overshadowed by Lysander, who was reacquainted with many of his supporters, men he had placed in control of the Greek cities at the end of the Peloponnesian War. Angered by his local aura, Agesilaus humiliated Lysander several times to force him to leave the army, despite his former relationship and Lysander's role in his accession to the throne. Plutarch adds that after Agesilaus's emancipation from him, Lysander returned to his undercover scheme to make the monarchy elective.

== Battle ==
After Lysander's departure, Agesilaus raided Phrygia, the satrapy of Pharnabazus, until his advance guard was defeated not far from Daskyleion by the superior Persian cavalry led by Bancaeus and Rathines. He then wintered at Ephesus, where he trained a cavalry force, perhaps on the advice of Xenophon, who had commanded the cavalry of the Ten Thousand. In 395, the Spartan king managed to trick Tissaphernes into thinking that he would attack Caria, in the south of Asia Minor, forcing the satrap to hold a defence line on the Meander river. Instead, Agesilaus moved north to the important city of Sardis. Tissaphernes hastened to meet the king there, but his cavalry sent in advance was defeated by Agesilaus's army.

== Aftermath ==
After his victory at the Battle of Sardis (395 BC), Agesilaus became the first king to be given the command of both land and sea. He delegated the naval command to his brother-in-law Peisander, whom he appointed navarch despite his inexperience; perhaps Agesilaus wanted to avoid the rise of a new Lysander, who owed his prominence to his time as navarch. After his defeat, Tissaphernes was executed and replaced as satrap by Tithraustes, who gave Agesilaus 30 talents to move north to the satrapy of Pharnabazus (Persian satraps were often bitter rivals). Augesilaus's Phrygian campaign of 394 was fruitless, as he lacked the siege equipment required to take the fortresses of Leonton Kephalai, Gordion, and Miletou Teichos.

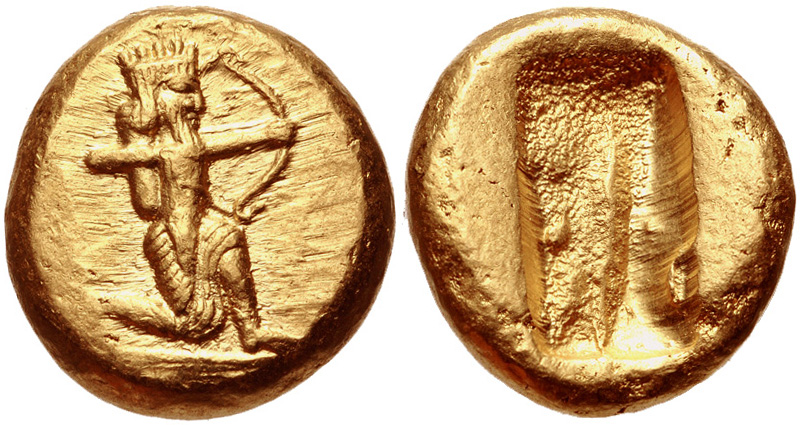
Tens of thousands of Darics (popularly called "archers"), the main currency in Persia, were used to bribe the Greek states to start a war against Sparta, so that Agesilaus would have to be recalled from Asia.

== See also ==
- Corinthian War
- Battle of Cnidus

== Modern sources ==
- Paul Cartledge, Sparta and Lakonia, A Regional History 1300–362 BC, London, Routledge, 1979 (originally published in 1979). ISBN 0-415-26276-3
- ——, Agesilaos and the Crisis of Sparta, Baltimore, Johns Hopkins University Press, 1987.
- Hamilton, Charles D. Agesilaus and the Failure of Spartan Hegemony. Ithaca, NY: Cornell University Press, 1991.
- Hamilton, Charles D. Sparta's Bitter Victories: Politics and Diplomacy in the Corinthian War. Ithaca, NY: Cornell University Press, 1979.
