= Sphodrias =

Spartan general (died 371 BC)

Sphodrias (Greek: Σφοδρίας) (d. 371 BC) was a Spartan general during the Spartan Hegemony over Greece. As governor of Thespiai in 378 BC, he made an unsuccessful attack against Athens without any order from Sparta. He was put on trial for this act, but unexpectedly acquitted, thanks to the support of the two Spartan kings, Cleombrotus I and Agesilaus II. This acquittal greatly upset Athens which rapidly concluded an alliance with Thebes against Sparta as a result.

Sphodrias later died at the battle of Leuctra against Thebes in 371 BC.

== Life ==
Sphodrias was a Spartan officer from the circle of the Agiad king Cleombrotus I (r. 380–371), who likely used his influence to appoint him harmost (military governor) of Thespiai in Boeotia, in central Greece. In a night of March 378, Sphodrias attempted to take control of Piraeus—the harbour of Athens—during a surprise night attack, while a Spartan delegation was precisely in Athens to conduct negotiations. Sparta at the time tried to prevent an alliance between Athens and its enemy Thebes, which was revengeful after Sparta had dismantled the Boeotian League at the end of the Corinthian War in 387 (hence the presence of a Spartan garrison in Thespiai, a former member of this league). Sphodrias' attack failed, but still scandalised the Athenians, who immediately arrested the three Spartan ambassadors. However, the Athenians soon released them after they were assured by Sparta that Sphodrias would be sued and executed for his uncalled action. Moreover, one of them was Etymokles, member of the Gerousia and friend of the other Spartan king Agesilaus II (r. 400–360), who yielded unprecedented influence over Spartan politics at the time. Agesilaus was also behind the embassy to win Athens against Thebes, which goal was put into jeopardy by Sphodrias' recklessness. Therefore, the Athenians confidently expected Agesilaus to use his influence to condemn Sphodrias, who had significantly harmed his interests.

Sphodrias was thus recalled to Sparta by the ephors to be tried before the Gerousia, the Spartan senate, which also served as supreme court. Fearing the influence of Agesilaus in the Gerousia, he fled and was judged in absentia, therefore implicitly admitting his guilt. However, against all odds, Sphodrias was acquitted. It is the only recorded time in ancient Greek and Roman history that someone judged in absentia for a capital charge was still acquitted. Sphodrias could logically count on the votes of Cleombrotus and his friends, but the decisive support came from Agesilaus, who had already been king for more than 20 years and was probably the most senior member of the Gerousia (as the gerontes had to be older than 60 to be elected), and by far the most influential. The two kings being in agreement, they and their supporters could outweigh any third group in the Gerousia.

Two ancient sources discuss Agesilaus' motivations. Plutarch tells that Sphodrias' son Kleonymos was the beloved of Agesilaus' son Archidamus (later king between 360–338), who convinced his father to spare Sphodrias, but this was probably a slur against Agesilaus and not the main reason. A contemporary and friend of Agesilaus, Xenophon has the same story but further writes that the king thought that it was not in Sparta's best interest to condemn a good soldier. G. E. M. de Ste. Croix writes that the oliganthropia—the dwindling number of Spartan citizens—already took alarming proportions, and Agesilaus refused to contribute to the problem. Paul Cartledge suggests that Agesilaus intervened in favour of Sphodrias to make the other king Cleombrotus "under a deep personal obligation to himself". Thus, Agesilaus favoured reinforcing his own position within Sparta over a diplomatic conciliation with Athens, which joined Thebes against Sparta as a result of the spectacularly unjust verdict. It was also a direct cause of the creation of the Second Athenian League in 378.

The case of Sphodrias presents several similarities with that of Phoebidas, another Spartan officer that acted on his own initiative to take the acropolis of Thebes, and was likewise acquitted during his trial by Agesilaus.

Sphodrias, as well as his son Kleonymos and king Cleombrotus, died at the battle of Leuctra against Thebes in 371.

== Bibliography ==
=== Ancient sources ===
- Plutarch, Parallel Lives (Agesilaus).
- Xenophon, Hellenica.

=== Modern sources ===
- Paul Cartledge, Agesilaos and the Crisis of Sparta, Baltimore, Johns Hopkins University Press, 1987. ISBN 978-0-7156-3032-7
- G. E. M. de Ste. Croix, The Origins of the Peloponnesian War, London, Duckworth, 1972. ISBN 0-7156-0640-9
