= Isidas =

4th-century BC Spartan hero

Isidas (Greek: Ἰσίδας) or Isadas (Greek: Ἰσαδας), son of the Spartan general Phoebidas, was a Spartan youth of remarkable beauty and stature celebrated for two feats of courage, both of which involved him fighting naked against the Thebans.

However, since both feats occurred eight years apart, if in both cases it was the same Isidas then in one case he would have been in his puberty and in the other in his late teens or early twenties.

The British painter Sir Charles Lock Eastlake made a painting of the scene for the Duke of Devonshire, entitled The Spartan Isidas or The Spartan Isadas at the Siege of Thebes (c. 1827), which hangs at Chatsworth House in England.

== Polyaenus's account ==
In 370 BCE, after winning the battle of Leuctra (371 BCE), the Thebans led by Epaminondas launched their first invasion of the Peloponnese to undermine the forces of Sparta, which had been defeated in that war. It was when the Thebans installed a garrison in the port city of Gythium that we first learn of Isidas.

According to Polyaenus, at Gythium, Isidas gathered a hundred youths from his circle of acquaintances, who anointed themselves with oil and tied olive wreaths on their heads. Then they hid daggers under their arms and ran naked across the plain, with Isidas in the lead and the others following. The Thebans were deceived by their appearance and thought they were just exercising, but the Laconians drew their daggers and attacked them. After killing some of the Thebans and driving out others, they recaptured Gythium.

== Plutarch's account ==
Eight years later, according to Plutarch's account, the fourth Theban invasion of the Peloponnese (362 BCE) took place, again led by general Epaminondas, who took advantage of the absence of king Agesilaus, who had gone to assist Mantineia in its opposition to Thebes, to attack unwalled Sparta. However, prince Archidamus, son of Agesilaus, distinguished himself in the defense of the city, in which we again see the courageous participation of Isidas.

Naked, without any protective armor or clothing—for he had just anointed himself with oil—Isidas leaped out of his house with a spear in one hand and a sword in the other, and passed through the midst of the combatants, moving back and forth among the enemy, striking down all who met him. No one did him any harm, either because they must have thought a god was protecting him for his bravery or because his enemies considered him taller and mightier than ordinary men. It is said that for this heroic deed the ephors placed a garland on his head and then fined him a thousand drachmas for daring to risk his life in battle without armor.

== Aelian's account ==
Aelian tells a slightly different version of this second appearance of Isidas. Calling him Isadas, he said that the Lacedaemonians crowned him, while still a boy, and not obliged by law to bear arms, for leaving the gymnasium (that is, naked) and behaving gallantly in a fight. However, because he engaged with the enemy before his age required it, and before he had received arms from his country, they fined him.

Since a Spartan youth was only eligible for military service at the age of twenty, Isadas, according to Aelian's version, must have been younger than that in this episode.
