= Gylis =

Early 4th-century BC Spartan polemarch

Gylis (also transcribed Gyllis or Gylus) was a Spartan polemarch under Agesilaus II at the Battle of Coronea in 394 BC in the Corinthian War.

On the morning after the battle, Agesilaus, to see whether the enemy would renew the fight, ordered Gylis (as he himself had been severely wounded) to draw up the army in order of battle, with crowns of victory on their heads, and to erect a trophy to the sound of martial instruments. The Thebans, however, who alone were in a position to dispute the field, acknowledged their defeat by requesting leave to bury their dead.

Soon after this, Agesilaus went to Delphi to dedicate to the god a tenth of his Asiatic spoils, and left Gylis to invade the territory of the Opuntian Locrians, who had been the occasion of the war in Greece. Here the Spartans collected much booty; but, as they were returning to their camp in the evening, the Locrians pressed on them with their darts, and slew many, among whom was Gylis himself.

The Gyllis who is mentioned in one of the epigrams of Damagetus has been identified by some with Othryades, but on insufficient grounds.
