= Leontiades =

4th-century BC Theban polemarch

Leontiades of Thebes, son of Eurymachus, and apparently a grandson of the Theban commander Leontiades in the Battle of Thermopylae.

He was one of the polemarchs at Thebes, in 382 BC, when the Spartan commander Phoebidas stopped there on his way against Olynthus. Unlike Ismenias, his democratic colleague, Leontiades courted Phoebidas from the period of his arrival, and, together with Archias and Philip, the other chiefs of the oligarchical party, instigated him to seize the Cadmeia with their aid. This enterprise having been effected on a day when the women were keeping the Thesmophoria in the citadel, and the council therefore sat in or near the agora, Leontiades proceeded to the council and announced what had taken place, proclaiming that his countrymen not despair, emphasizing that the Spartans are enemies to no one but those who want war. Then, asserting that his office of polemarch gave him power to apprehend any one under suspicion of a capital offence, he caused Ismenias to be seized and thrown into prison. Archias was then appointed to the office thus vacated, and Leontiades went to Sparta and persuaded the Lacedaemonians to sanction what had been done. Accordingly, they sent commissioners to Thebes, who condemned Ismenias to death, and fully established Leontiades and his faction in the government under the protection of the Spartan garrison. In effect, Leontiades and his faction ruled tyrannically, controlling the state for themselves with the help of the Spartan garrison.

In this position, exposed to the hostility and machinations of some 400 democratic exiles, who had taken refuge at Athens, He sent emissaries to Athens in an effort to remove the chief of the exiles by assassination, though Androcleides was the only one who fell a victim to the plot.

In 379 BC, when the refugees, associated with Pelopidas, had entered on their enterprise for the deliverance of Thebes, Pelopidas himself, with Cephisodorus, Damocleidas, and Phyllidas, went to the house of Leontiades, while Melon and others were dealing with Archias. The house was closed for the night, and it was with some difficulty that the conspirators gained admittance. Leontiades met them at the door of his chamber, and killed Cephisodorus, who was the first that entered. But, after an obstinate sword fight, he was himself killed by Pelopidas.
