= Androcleides =

Androcleides (Ancient Greek: Ἀνδροκλείδης) was a politician of ancient Thebes. In the 390s BCE, Thebes was a city divided between factions desiring an alliance with Sparta, and factions desiring an alliance with Athens, and Androcleides led the Athenian faction, along with Ismenias.

Androcleides was bribed by Timocrates, the emissary of Tissaphernes, in 395, in order to induce the Thebans to make war upon the Spartans and thus bring back Agesilaus from Asia.

In 382, the Spartan commander Phoebidas, stationed at Thespiae, urged the Spartan faction of Thebes to take over the citadel of Thebes known as the Cadmeia. The democratic leaders of the Theban faction, Androcleides and Pherenicus, escaped to Athens as exiles. One of leaders of the Spartan faction of Thebes, Leontiades, later had Androcleides assassinated during his exile.
