= Agesilaus (Xenophon) =

Work by Xenophon

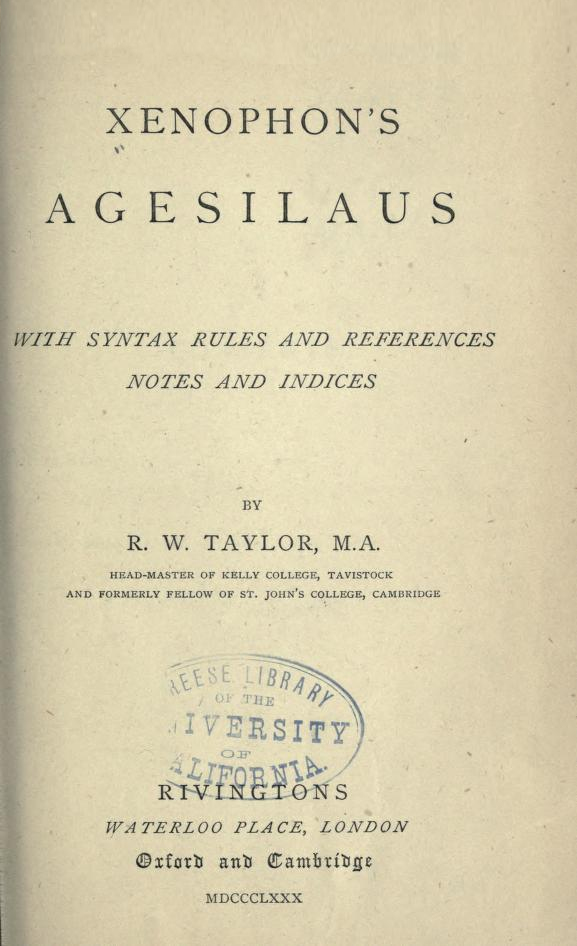
Xenophon's Agesilaus.

The Agesilaus (/əˌdʒɛsəˈleɪəs/; Ancient Greek: Ἀγησίλαος) is a minor work by the Ancient Greek writer Xenophon.

The Agesilaus is a posthumous biography of the eponymous Agesilaus II (c. 440 BC – c. 360 BC), the King of Sparta, general, and important patron of Xenophon. Xenophon’s stated goal is to produce an encomium or eulogy. Xenophon portrays Agesilaus as a highly skilled military tactician and ruler, endowed with exemplary moral virtue and character. The Agesilaus provides an outline of Xenophon’s views on virtue, with the Spartan king used as a role model throughout.

The Agesilaus was written shortly after Agesilaus’ death in 360-359 BC large parts of it were copied over to the second part of Hellenica, a history also by Xenophon, with only slight alterations.

== Outline ==
The Agesilaus is organised into 11 chapters, though a majority of the work is contained in chapters 1 and 2, which are devoted primarily to Agesilaus’ deeds. Chapter 1 sensationally introduces the subject as a “perfectly good” man, explaining that it “I know is not easy to write a praise worthy of both the virtue and reputation of Agesilaus.” Agesilaus’ ancestry is briefly considered, Xenophon celebrating his “good birth” and ancestry, supposedly a direct descendant of the mythological Heracles.

For the rest of Chapter 1, Xenophon explores Agesilaus’ military exploits against the backdrop of Sparta’s war with the Persian Empire over control of Greek settlements in Asia Minor. According to Xenophon, Agesilaus deceived the Persian general Tissaphernes, attacking towards Phrygia instead of Caria, Tissaphernes’ home, in so doing collecting allies along the way and allowing the takeover of several settlements without major struggle. This move is described as “characteristic of a good general”, and Tissaphernes’ blundering is juxtaposed with Agesilaus’ brilliance. Chapter 2, which brings the work beyond the halfway point, covers about 35 years; that is, from Agesilaus’ return to the Greek mainland in about 394 BC, to his death in 360 BC. The Corinthian War is described, and this description would be included nearly exactly in Hellenica. The Battle of Coronea is recounted, remembered by Xenophon as “unlike any other in our time”. Xenophon uses the battle to illustrate Agesilaus’ grasp of military strategy, as well as his charity towards the vanquished. Sparta was victorious, and Thebans who survived were honourably afforded protection by Agesilaus and permitted to leave whenever they wished. After that, Agesilaus returns to Sparta, and the remainder of the chapter is devoted to Sparta’s war with Thebes as part of the Boeotian War, as well as its conflicts with other states on the Greek peninsula.

Chapters 3 through to 10 elaborate on Agesilaus’ character and virtues, while the eleventh and final chapter provides a memorable summary of the work. This part of the book deals more heavily with Agesilaus’ character and virtue.

== Historical reliability ==
Xenophon’s claims regarding Agesilaus’ wartime activities are supposed to have a certain degree of reliability, as Xenophon was in close proximity to Agesilaus as a member of a mercenary band deployed against the Persians in Asia Minor. During this conflict Xenophon occupied a senior position in the Spartan military command and therefore likely communicated directly Agesilaus. He fought in the Battle of Coronea, and would have bore witness, and taken part in, Agesilaus’ battlefield manoeuvres. After Agesilaus’ army returned home, Xenophon remained in Sparta, residing in the Peloponnesian estate of Scillus, placing him in the upper echelons of Spartan society and presumably in close, regular contact with the King. Also at Xenophon’s disposal were a great many of veterans of Agesilaus’ campaigns and Spartan notables who would have had an intimate understanding of Sparta’s recent history.

The reliability of the Agesilaus is strained, however, as certain facts or individuals are omitted by Xenophon in order to suit the narrative of Agesilaus’ singular greatness. Agesilaus’ decision to send a force over to Asia Minor to strike against the Persian menace is framed as a stroke of strategic genius by Xenophon, when in reality it was his general and advisor, Lysander, who spearheaded the action. Conspicuously absent is any mention of the fact that the Sparta was run by two co-monarchs, neither more powerful than the other, but Agesilaus is presented as the sole ruler of the polity.

George Cawkwell of the University of Oxford wrote of the encomium that “the events of the 380s were almost a generation past when Xenophon, himself now ageing, recorded them. Old men forget and time adds its gloss”. In other words, Xenophon’s potentially faulty memory is no basis for a factually accurate historical work.

== Themes ==
The Agesilaus deals extensively with the meaning of good leadership and arete (ἀρετή, excellence in general), with King Agesilaus being a role model for both. Xenophon states that Agesilaus was a more than fit choice for king before he took over on the basis of his genos (γένος), being a descendent of Heracles, and unmistakeable signs of arete. Particularly worthy of praise to Xenophon was Agesilaus’ righteousness or justice (δικαιοσύνη), in this case the apparent lack of desire in Agesilaus to enrich himself at the expense his comrades and subjects. Agesilaus was incorruptible in this regard, for “no one ever lodged a legal complaint of being deprived [of money] by Agesilaus, but many agreed that they were treated well by him in many respects”. Xenophon extolls Agesilaus’ enkrateia (ἐνκράτεια). Agesilaus was able to limit excessive eating and drinking and avoid acting on any sexual temptations (that Hellenica tells us were of a homosexual nature).

Agesilaus did not shy away from a fight with the other Greek states and did so with great andreia (ἀνδρεία), or courage. Regarding the decision go it war, “it seems to me that he supplied proofs that are not immanifest, by always undertaking to wage war against the strongest enemies both of his city and of Greece and, in the contests against them, stationing himself in the fore”. In battle, Agesilaus made tactical choices that other commanders might have been too cautious to make: “he did not choose for himself the safest things: for although it was possible for him to let pass the men charging and then to pursue and defeat their rear, he did not do this but came to blows with the Thebans head-on.” In connection to this, Xenophon praises Agesilaus’ active lifestyle in his advanced years (Agesilaus was in his 80s when he died); he would not “claim as an excuse his old age”. However, as Robert C. Bartlett remarks, Xenophon contradicts himself elsewhere by mentioning that Agesilaus refused to take the field when war again erupted with Thebes, citing old age.

In addition to his courage, noble stock and self-control, Agesilaus was also highly patriotic and generous towards his people. Those who behaved as such had the virtue of sofia (σοφία). Agesilaus was powerful, but he did not abuse his power, conscientiously adhering to the rules of Spartan society, in turn forging a mutual respect between him and his people, “for who would wish to be disobedient when he sees the king being obedient?”.

== Bibliography ==
Cawkwell, G. L. "Agesilaus and Sparta." The Classical Quarterly 26, no. 1 (1976): 62-84. http://www.jstor.org/stable/638399.

Christesen, Paul. "Xenophon’s Views on Sparta." In The Cambridge Companion to Xenophon, edited by Michael A. Flower. Cambridge Companions to Literature, 376-400. Cambridge: Cambridge University Press, 2016.

Konstan, David. "Afterword: Before Virtue." In Xenophon’s Virtues, edited by Danzig Gabriel, M. Johnson David and Konstan David, 467-80. Berlin, Boston: De Gruyter, 2024.

Xenophon. "Chapter 2. Agesilaus: Translated by Robert C. Bartlett." In The Shorter Writings, edited by A. McBrayer Gregory, 51-78. Ithaca, NY: Cornell University Press, 2018, 75.

Xenophon. 1925. “Agesilaus.” Data set. Digital Loeb Classical Library. https://doi.org/10.4159/dlcl.xenophon_athens-agesilaus.1925, 10.3, Accessed 24 March 2025.
