= Battle of Coronea (394 BC) =

Land battle of the Corinthian War

- Part of the Corinthian War
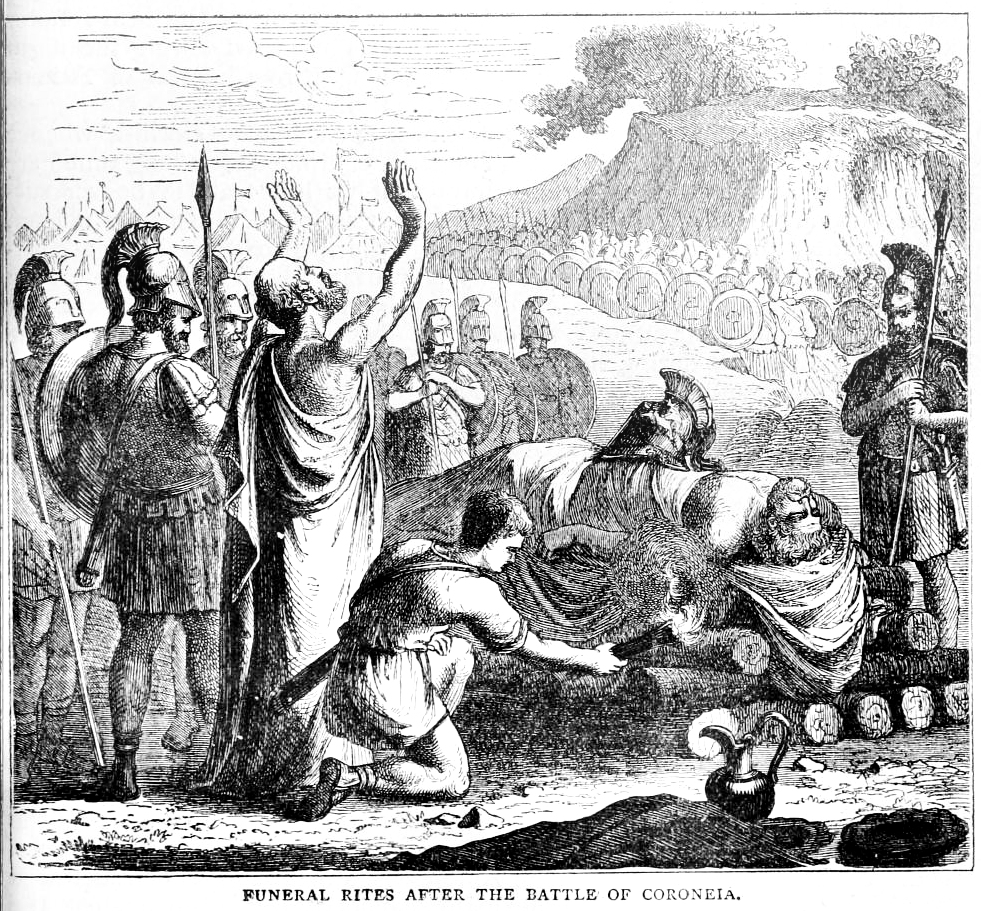
- Funeral rites after the Battle of Coroneia
| Date | 394 BC |
| Location | Coronea 38°21′N 22°58′E |
| Result | Spartan victory |

Belligerents
| Sparta; Orchomenus; Phocis | Thebes; Argos; Athens; Locris; Euboea; Boeotian League |

Commanders and leaders
| Agesilaus II: Gylis; Herippidas | Thrasybulus (Athenian contingent) |

Strength
| 15,000 | 20,000 |

Casualties and losses
| 350 | 600+ |
- Location of the Battle of Coronea (394 BC).

The Battle of Coronea in 394 BC, also Battle of Coroneia, took place during the Corinthian War, in which the Spartans and their allies under King Agesilaus II defeated a force of Thebans and Argives that was attempting to block their march back into the Peloponnese. It ranks among the deadliest of the Hoplite battles, despite its comparative obscurity, when matched up against more famous battles like the Battle of Delium in 424, and the Battle of Mantinea in 362.

== Prelude ==
The Corinthian War began in 395 BC when Thebes, Argos, Corinth, and Athens, with Persian support and funding, united to oppose Spartan intervention in Locris and Phocis. At the start of the war, Agesilaus was in Ionia, campaigning against the Persians. When hostilities opened, he was recalled with his forces, and began an overland march through Thrace and central Greece back to the Peloponnese. Entering Boeotia, he was opposed by a force composed primarily of Thebans, allied Boeotians, and Argives.

Agesilaus's forces were composed of a regiment and a half of Spartiates, augmented by a force of freed helots, a sizable force of allied troops from the Peloponnese and Ionia, and a large contingent of mercenaries. Facing him on the plain, near the foot of Mount Helicon, was an army made up of Boeotians, Athenians, Argives, Corinthians, Euboeans, and Locrians. In all, the allies probably had 20,000 hoplites. To oppose these, Agesilaus had 15,000 hoplites. The cavalry forces of the two sides were roughly equal, but Agesilaus had substantially more peltasts.

Prior to the battle some of Agesilaus's army were disturbed by an omen witnessed some days before, when the sun had appeared crescent shaped. To reassure his men, Agesilaus first reminded them of the recent Spartan victory at Nemea. He then told them that the Spartan navarch Peisander had been killed in a victory over the Persian fleet. In fact, as Agesilaus knew, Peisander had been killed while suffering a crushing defeat at Cnidus. These reassurances, however, buoyed his army's morale going into the battle.

The defeat at Nemea weighed heavily on the Argives and Corinthians. The Athenians were too familiar with the ups and downs of their previous long and disastrous war against Sparta, and the willingness of the Persians to switch support from one side to the other, to be overly encouraged. Only the Boeotians seemed confident of ultimate victory.

== Battle ==
As the two armies approached each other, Agesilaus himself commanded the Spartans on the extreme right flank of his army, the veterans of the "Ten Thousand" were next to the Spartans, the Asian Greeks were next to them, then came the Phocians, and the Orchomenians held the extreme left flank. The Thebans faced the Orchomenians and the Argives faced the Spartans. Both armies advanced in total silence. At about 200 metres (660 ft), the Thebans shouted their war cry and charged at the run. At about 100 metres (330 ft), the veterans of the "Ten Thousand" (under the Spartiate Herippidas) and the Asian Greeks charged the troops opposite them at the run. The veterans and the Asians quickly routed the troops opposite them. The Argives panicked even before the Spartans under Agesilaus could make contact and fled to Mount Helicon.

The mercenaries near Agesilaus assumed the battle was over and offered him a garland to commemorate his victory. Just then news came that on the other flank, the Thebans had broken through the Orchomenians and were already at the baggage train, ransacking the loot taken from Asia. Agesilaus immediately wheeled his phalanx around and headed for the Thebans. At that moment, the Thebans noticed that their allies had fled to Mount Helicon. They formed up with the desperate design of breaking through Agesilaus's lines to rejoin the rest of their army.

Agesilaus decided to oppose them by putting his phalanx directly in their path instead of taking them in the rear or flank, a decision that may have been influenced by his longstanding animosity towards Thebes. What followed was evidently one of the worst blood baths in the history of hoplite battles. As Xenophon described it, “So shield pressed upon shield they struggled, killed and were killed in turn.” In the end, a few Thebans broke through to Mount Helicon but, in the words of Xenophon, “many others were killed on their way there.”

== Aftermath ==
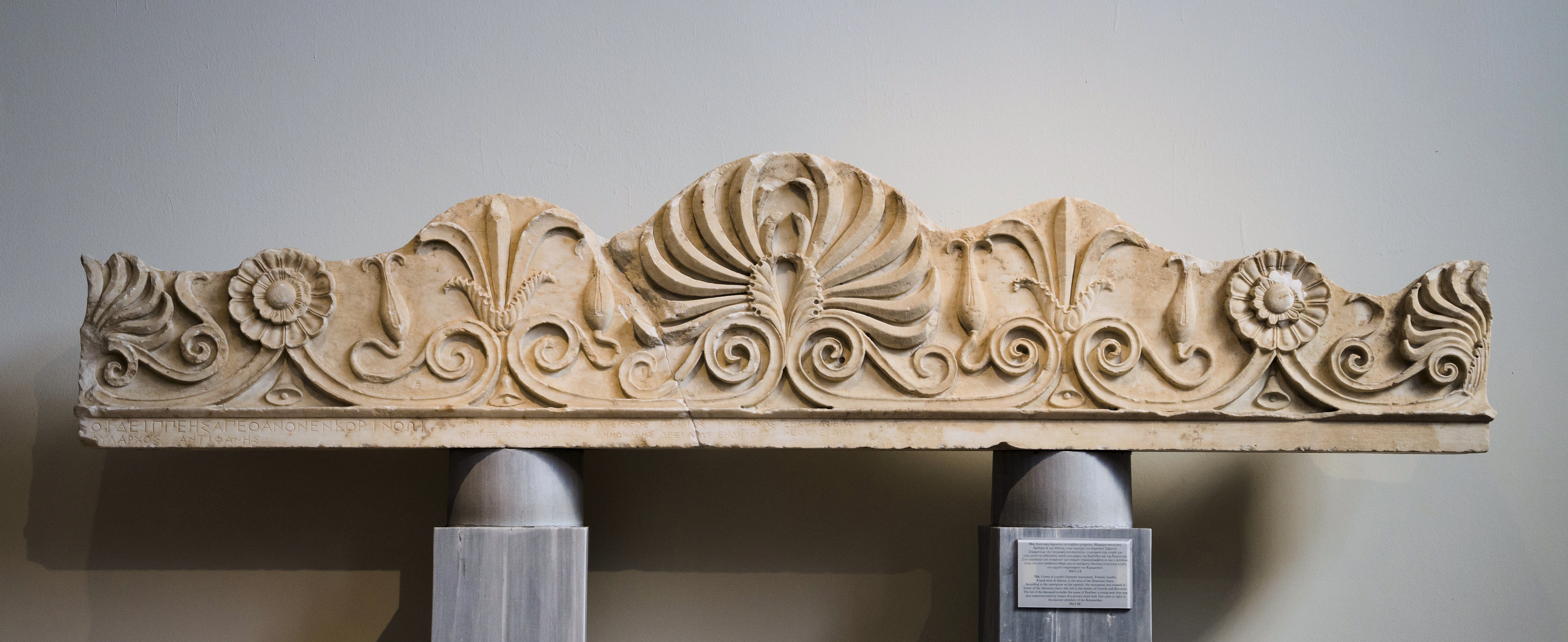
Funerary crown dedicated to five Athenian cavalrymen including Dexileos, also known from the famous Grave Stele of Dexileos, who fell in the Battle of Corinth (394 BC) and the Battle of Coronea. 394/3 BC. Athens National Archaeological Museum, Nb.754

Agesilaus himself had been wounded in the battle and had to be carried back to the phalanx. There some cavalry rode up, informing him that about 80 of the enemy had taken refuge in a nearby temple. Agesilaus ordered that they be spared and allowed to go wherever they wished. The next morning, Agesilaus ordered the polemarch Gylis to put the army in battle formation and gave out awards for valour, received a delegation from the Thebans and allowed them to collect their dead. The army then retired to Phocis and invaded Locris where the polemarch Gylis was killed.

According to Diodorus Siculus, more than 600 of the Boeotians and their allies fell, and the Spartans lost 350 men.

== See also ==
- Corinthian War
- Agesilaus II
- Koroneia, Boeotia
