= Ismenias =

4th century BC Theban politician

Ismenias (Ancient Greek: Ἰσμηνίας) was an ancient Theban politician of the 4th century BC, leader of the Theban democratic faction.

He rose to power in 403 BC, a year after the end of the Peloponnesian War, and pursued an anti-Spartan policy, which included harboring exiles fleeing from the Thirty Tyrants in Athens. In 382 BC, during a Spartan occupation of Thebes, he was identified, along with Androcleides, as one of the leaders of the anti-Spartan faction. He was imprisoned and executed for Medism.

Plato, in his work Meno, names him as an example of someone who made a great amount of money in a short period of time, "as much as Polycrates", by acquiring his wealth through a Persian gift, and in the Republic, he includes him in a list of rich and powerful men with little moral fiber. In 2008, Monique Canto-Sperber suggested that this money came from Persia with the aim of weakening Sparta.
