= Bancaeus =

Ancient Persian military leader

Bancaeus (Ancient Greek: Βαγκαῖος) or Bagaeus (Ancient Greek: Βαγαῖος) was a Persian man of the 4th and 5th centuries BCE.

He was a half-brother of the satrap Pharnabazus II, is mentioned by the writer Xenophon as co-commander of a body of Persian cavalry, with Rathines, which, in a skirmish near Dascylium, defeated the cavalry of the Spartan king Agesilaus II, in the first year of his invasion of Asia, in 396 BCE.
