= Agesilaus II =

4th-century BC Spartan king, Eurypontid dynasty

King of Sparta
- Reign: c. 400 – 360 BC
- Predecessor: Agis II
- Successor: Archidamus III
- Born: 445/4 BC; Sparta
- Died: 360/59 BC (aged c. 84); Cyrenaica
- Spouse: Cleora
- Issue: Archidamus III
- Greek: Ἀγησίλαος Agesilaos
- Dynasty: Eurypontid
- Father: Archidamus II
- Mother: Eupoleia

Military service
- Battles/wars: Spartan hegemony Battle of Sardis (395 BC); Corinthian War; Battle of Coroneia; Theban–Spartan War; Revolt of Ariobarzanes (366 BCE)

Agesilaus II (/əˌdʒɛsəˈleɪəs/; Ancient Greek: Ἀγησίλαος Agēsílāos; 445/4 – 360/59 BC) was king of Sparta from c. 400 to c. 360 BC. Generally considered the most important king in the history of Sparta, Agesilaus was the main actor during the period of Spartan hegemony that followed the Peloponnesian War (431–404 BC). Although brave in combat, Agesilaus lacked the diplomatic skills to preserve Sparta's position, especially against the rising power of Thebes, which reduced Sparta to a secondary power after its victory at Leuctra in 371 BC.

Despite the traditional secrecy fostered by the Spartiates, the reign of Agesilaus is particularly well-known thanks to the works of his friend Xenophon, who wrote a large history of Greece (the Hellenica) covering the years 411 to 362 BC, therefore extensively dealing with Agesilaus's rule. Xenophon furthermore composed a panegyric biography of his friend, perhaps to clean his memory from the criticisms voiced against him. Another historical tradition—much more hostile to Agesilaus than Xenophon's writings—has been preserved in the Hellenica Oxyrhynchia, and later continued by Diodorus of Sicily. Moreover, Plutarch wrote a biography of Agesilaus in his Parallel Lives, which contains many elements deliberately omitted by Xenophon.

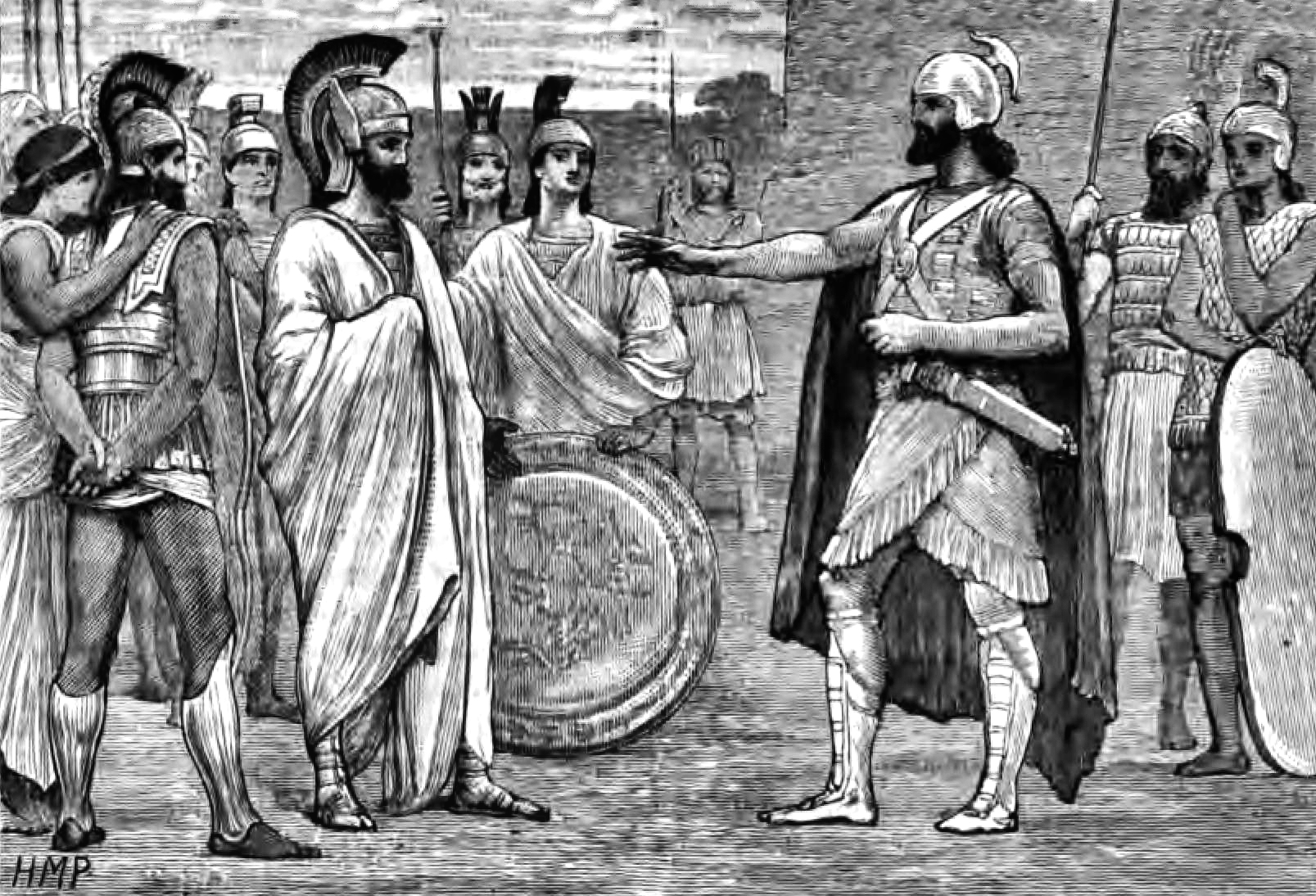
Meeting between Spartan king Agesilaus (left) and Pharnabazus II (right) in 395 BC, when Agesilaus agreed to remove himself from Hellespontine Phrygia.

== Early life ==
=== Youth ===
Agesilaus's father was King Archidamos II (r. 469–427), who belonged to the Eurypontid dynasty, one of the two royal families of Sparta. Archidamos already had a son from a first marriage with Lampito (his own step-aunt) named Agis. After the death of Lampito, Archidamos remarried in the early 440s with Eupolia, daughter of Melesippidas, whose name indicates an aristocratic status. The dates of Agesilaus's birth, death, and reign are disputed. The only secured information is that he was 84 at his death. The majority opinion is to date his birth to 445/4, but a minority of scholars move it a bit later, c.442. Most of the other dates of Agesilaus are similarly disputed, with the minority moving them about two years later than the majority. (Note: The article follows the majority view, but mentions the dates favoured by the minority view.) Agesilaus also had a sister named Kyniska (the first woman in ancient history to achieve an Olympic victory). The name Agesilaus was rare and harks back to Agesilaus I, one of the earliest kings of Sparta.

Agesilaus was born with a limp. It is often said that in Sparta deformed babies were thrown into a chasm, meaning that Agesilaus's disability should have cost him his life. It is possible that he received some leniency from the tribal elders who examined male infants, or that at the time of his birth, only the most severely impaired babies were killed due to a demographic decline. However, it is more likely that the Spartans did not really have any specific policy that encouraged infanticide.

Starting at the age of 7, Agesilaus had to go through the rigorous education system of Sparta, called the agoge. Despite his disability, he brilliantly completed the training, which massively enhanced his prestige, especially after he became king. Indeed, as heirs-apparent were exempted of the agoge, few Spartan kings had gone through the same training as the citizens; another notable exception was Leonidas, the embodiment of the "hero-king". Between 433 and 428, Agesilaus also became the rumored younger lover of Lysander, an aristocrat from the circle of Archidamos, whose family had some influence in Libya.

=== Spartan prince ===
Little is known of Agesilaus's adult life before his reign, principally because Xenophon—his friend and main biographer—only wrote about his reign. Due to his special status, Agesilaus likely became a member of the Krypteia, an elite corps of young Spartans going undercover in Spartan territory to kill some helots deemed dangerous. Once he turned 20 and became a full citizen, Agesilaus was elected to a common mess, presumably that of his elder half-brother Agis II, who had become king in 427, of which Lysander was perhaps a member.

Agesilaus probably served during the Peloponnesian War (431–404) against Athens, likely at the Battle of Mantinea in 418. Agesilaus married Kleora at some point between 408 and 400. Despite the influence she apparently had on her husband, she is mostly unknown. Her father was Aristomenidas, an influential noble with connections in Thebes.

Thanks to three treaties signed with Persia in 412–411, Sparta received funding from the Persians, which it used to build a fleet that ultimately defeated Athens. This fleet was essentially led by Lysander, whose success gave him an enormous influence in the Greek cities of Asia as well as in Sparta, where he even schemed to become king. In 403 the two kings, Agis and Pausanias, acted together to relieve him from his command.

== Reign ==
=== Accession to the throne (400–398 BC) ===
Agis II died while returning from Delphi between 400 and 398. (Note: The precise date of Agesilaus's accession depends on the chronology of the Elean War and of his own date of death, which are uncertain. Cartledge dates it to the late summer of 400, Hamilton to 398.) After his funeral, Agesilaus contested the claim of Leotychidas, the son of Agis II, using the widespread belief in Sparta that Leotychidas was an illegitimate son of Alcibiades—a famous Athenian statesman and nephew of Pericles, who had gone into exile in Sparta during the Peloponnesian War, and then seduced the queen. The rumours were strengthened by the fact that even Agis only recognised Leotychidas as his son on his deathbed.

Diopeithes, a supporter of Leotychidas, however quoted an old oracle telling that a Spartan king could not be lame, thus refuting Agesilaus's claim, but Lysander cunningly returned the objection by saying that the oracle had to be understood figuratively. The lameness warned against by the oracle would therefore refer to the doubt on Leotychidas's paternity, and this reasoning won the argument. The role of Lysander in the accession of Agesilaus has been debated among historians, principally because Plutarch makes him the main instigator of the plot, while Xenophon downplays Lysander's influence. Lysander doubtless supported Agesilaus's accession because he hoped that the new king would in return help him to regain the importance that he lost in 403.

=== Conspiracy of Cinadon (399 BC) ===
The Conspiracy of Cinadon took place during the first year of Agesilaus's reign, in the summer of 399. Cinadon was a hypomeion, a Spartan who had lost his citizen status, presumably because he could not afford the price of the collective mess—one of the main reasons for the dwindling number of Spartan citizens in the Classical Era, called oliganthropia. It is probable that the vast influx of wealth coming to the city after its victory against Athens in 404 triggered inflation in Sparta, which impoverished many citizens with a fixed income, like Cinadon, and caused their downgrade. Therefore, the purpose of the plot was likely to restore the status of these disfranchised citizens. However, the plot was uncovered and Cinadon and its leaders executed—probably with the active participation of Agesilaus, but no further action was taken to solve the social crisis at the origin of the conspiracy. The failure of Agesilaus to acknowledge the critical problem suffered by Sparta at the time has been criticised by modern historians.

=== Invasion of Asia Minor (396–394 BC) ===
According to the treaties signed in 412 and 411 between Sparta and the Persian Empire, the latter became the overlord of the Greek city-states of Asia Minor. In 401, these cities and Sparta supported the bid of Cyrus the Younger (the Persian Emperor's younger son and a good friend of Lysander) against his elder brother, the new emperor Artaxerxes II, who nevertheless defeated Cyrus at Cunaxa. As a result, Sparta remained at war with Artaxerxes, and supported the Greek cities of Asia, which fought against Tissaphernes, the satrap of Lydia and Caria. In 397 Lysander engineered a large expedition in Asia headed by Agesilaus, likely to recover the influence he had over the Asian cities at the end of the Peloponnesian War. In order to win the approval of the Spartan assembly, Lysander built an army with only 30 Spartiates (full Spartan citizens), so the risk would be limited; the bulk of the army consisted of 2,000 neodamodes (freed helots) and 6,000 Greek allies. In addition, Agesilaus obtained the support of the oracles of Zeus at Olympia and Apollo at Delphi.

==== The sacrifice at Aulis (396 BC) ====
Lysander and Agesilaus had intended the expedition to be a Panhellenic enterprise, but Athens, Corinth, and especially Thebes, refused to participate. In Spring 396, Agesilaus came to Aulis (in Boeotian territory) to sacrifice on the place where Agamemnon had done so just before his departure to Troy at the head of the Greek army in the Iliad, thus giving a grandiose aspect to the expedition. However he did not inform the Boeotians and brought his own seer to perform the sacrifice, instead of the local one. Learning this, the Boeotians prevented him from sacrificing and further humiliated him by casting away the victim; they perhaps intended to provoke a confrontation, as the relations between Sparta and Thebes had become execrable. Agesilaus then left to Asia, but Thebes remained hateful to him for the rest of his life.

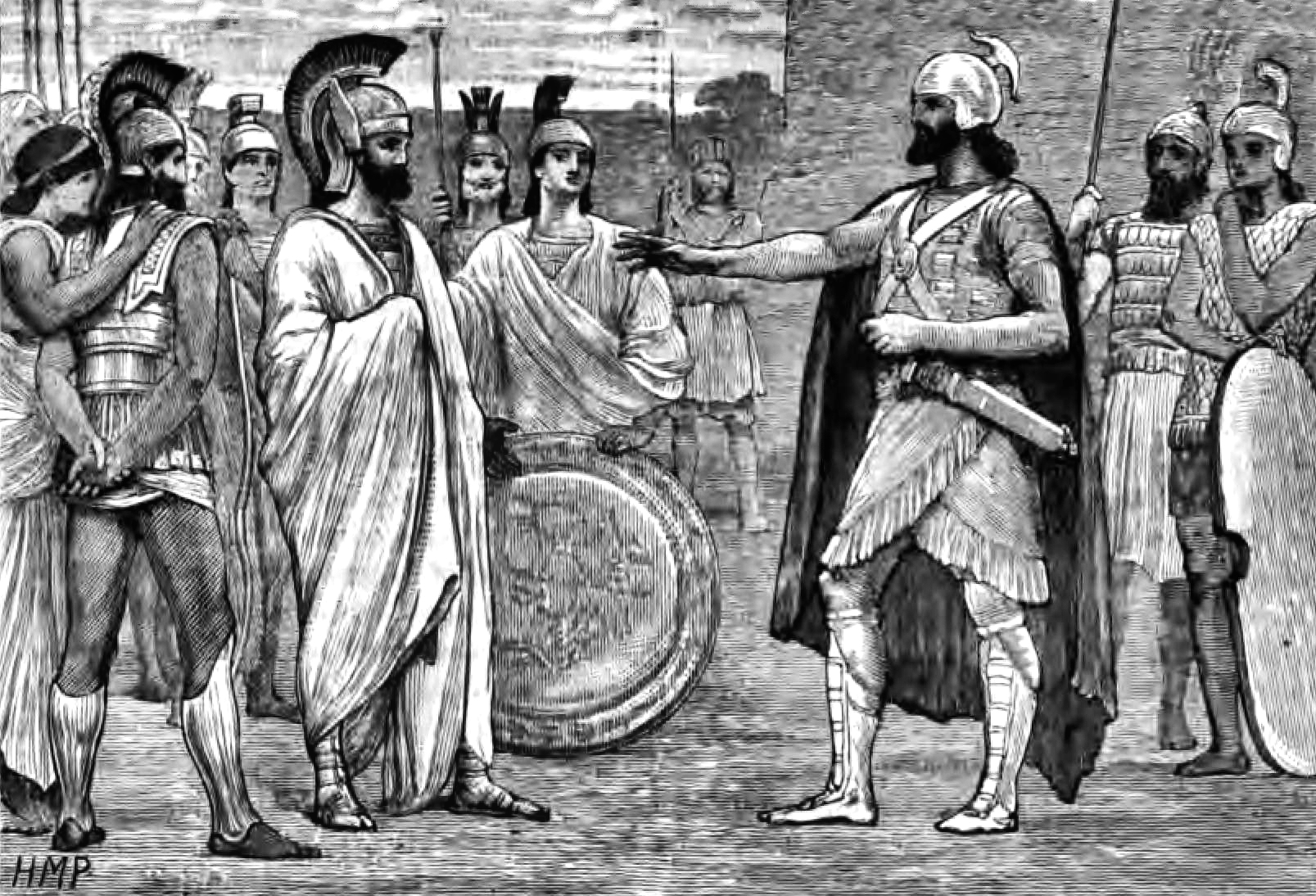
Meeting between Spartan king Agesilaus (left) and Pharnabazus II (right) in 395 BC, when Agesilaus agreed to remove himself from Hellespontine Phrygia.

==== Campaign in Asia (396–394 BC) ====
Once Agesilaus landed in Ephesus, the Spartan main base, he concluded a three months' truce with Tissaphernes, likely to settle the affairs among the Greek allies. He integrated some of the Greek mercenaries formerly hired by Cyrus the Younger (the Ten Thousand) in his army. They had returned from Persia under the leadership of Xenophon, who also remained in Agesilaus's staff. In Ephesus, Agesilaus's authority was nevertheless overshadowed by Lysander, who was reacquainted with many of his supporters, men he had placed in control of the Greek cities at the end of the Peloponnesian War. Angered by his local aura, Agesilaus humiliated Lysander several times to force him to leave the army, despite his former relationship and Lysander's role in his accession to the throne. Plutarch adds that after Agesilaus's emancipation from him, Lysander returned to his undercover scheme to make the monarchy elective.

After Lysander's departure, Agesilaus raided Phrygia, the satrapy of Pharnabazus, until his advance guard was defeated not far from Daskyleion by the superior Persian cavalry led by Bancaeus and Rathines. He then wintered at Ephesus, where he trained a cavalry force, perhaps on the advice of Xenophon, who had commanded the cavalry of the Ten Thousand. In 395, the Spartan king managed to trick Tissaphernes into thinking that he would attack Caria, in the south of Asia Minor, forcing the satrap to hold a defence line on the Meander river. Instead, Agesilaus moved north to the important city of Sardis. Tissaphernes hastened to meet the king there, but his cavalry sent in advance was defeated by Agesilaus's army. After his victory at the Battle of Sardis, Agesilaus became the first king to be given the command of both land and sea. He delegated the naval command to his brother-in-law Peisander, whom he appointed navarch despite his inexperience; perhaps Agesilaus wanted to avoid the rise of a new Lysander, who owed his prominence to his time as navarch. After his defeat, Tissaphernes was executed and replaced as satrap by Tithraustes, who gave Agesilaus 30 talents to move north to the satrapy of Pharnabazus (Persian satraps were often bitter rivals). Agesilaus's Phrygian campaign of 394 was fruitless, as he lacked the siege equipment required to take the fortresses of Leonton Kephalai, Gordion, and Miletou Teichos.

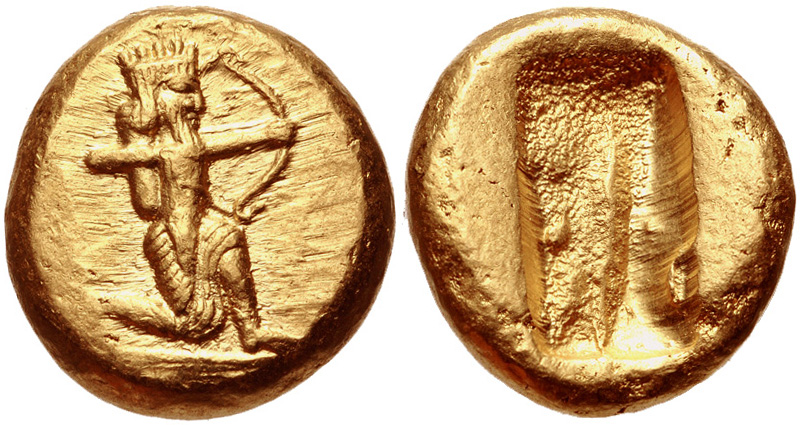
Tens of thousands of Darics (popularly called "archers"), the main currency in Persia, were used to bribe the Greek states to start a war against Sparta, so that Agesilaus would have to be recalled from Asia.

Xenophon tells that Agesilaus then wanted to campaign further east in Asia and sow discontent among the subjects of the Achaemenid empire, or even to conquer Asia. Plutarch went further and wrote that Agesilaus had prepared an expedition to the heart of Persia, up to her capital of Susa, thus making him a forerunner of Alexander the Great. It is very unlikely that Agesilaus really had such a grand campaign in mind; regardless, he was soon forced to return to Europe in 394.

=== Corinthian War (395–387 BC) ===
Although Thebes and Corinth had been allies of Sparta throughout the Peloponnesian War, they were dissatisfied by the settlement of the war in 404, with Sparta as leader of the Greek world. Sparta's imperialist expansion in the Aegean greatly upset its former allies, notably by establishing friendly regimes and garrisons in smaller cities. Through large gifts, Tithraustes also encouraged Sparta's former allies to start a war in order to force the recall of Agesilaus from Asia—even though the influence of Persian gold has been exaggerated. The initiative came from Thebes, which provoked a war between their ally Ozolian Locris and Phocis in order to bring Sparta to the latter's defence. Lysander and the other king Pausanias entered Boeotia, which enabled the Thebans to bring Athens in the war. Lysander then besieged Haliartus without waiting for Pausanias and was killed in a Boeotian counter-attack. In Sparta, Pausanias was condemned to death by Lysander's friends and went into exile. After its success at Haliartus, Thebes was able to build a coalition against Sparta, with notably Argos and Corinth, where a war council was established, and securing the defection of most of the cities of northern and central Greece. Unable to wage war on two fronts and with the loss of Lysander and Pausanias, Sparta had no choice but to recall Agesilaus from Asia. The Asian Greeks fighting for him said they wanted to continue serving with him, while Agesilaus promised he would return to Asia as soon as he could.

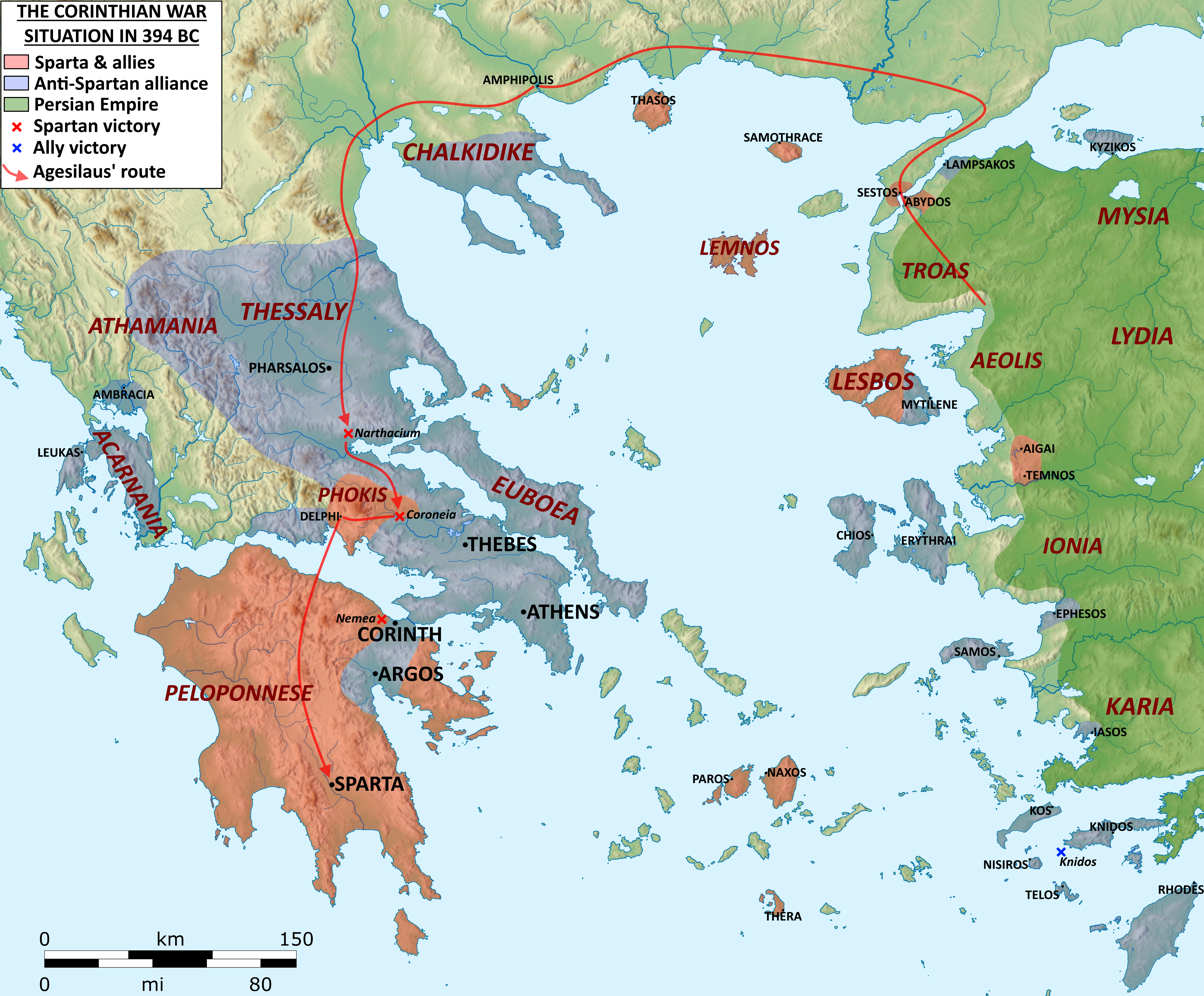
Map of the situation in the Aegean in 394 BC, with the long return of Agesilaus from Asia.

Agesilaus returned to Greece by land, crossing the Hellespont and from there along the coast of the Aegean Sea. In Thessaly he won a cavalry battle near Narthacium against the Pharsalians who had made an alliance with Thebes. He then entered Boeotia by the Thermopylae, where he received reinforcements from Sparta. Meanwhile, Aristodamos—the regent of the young Agiad king Agesipolis—won a major victory at Nemea near Argos, which was offset by the disaster of the Spartan navy at Cnidus against the Persian fleet led by Conon, an exiled Athenian general. Agesilaus lied to his men about the outcome of the battle of Knidos to avoid demoralising them as they were about to fight a large engagement against the combined armies of Thebes, Athens, Argos and Corinth. The following Battle of Coronea was a classic clash between two lines of hoplites. The anti-Spartan allies were rapidly defeated, but the Thebans managed to retreat in good order, despite Agesilaus's activity on the front line, which caused him several injuries. The next day the Thebans requested a truce to recover their dead, therefore conceding defeat, although they had not been bested on the battlefield. Agesilaus appears to have tried to win an honourable victory, by risking his life and being merciful with some Thebans who had sought shelter in the nearby Temple of Athena Itonia. He then moved to Delphi, where he offered one tenth of the booty he had amassed since his landing at Ephesus, and returned to Sparta.

No pitched battle took place in Greece in 393. Perhaps Agesilaus was still recovering from his wounds, or he was deprived of command because of the opposition of Lysander's and Pausanias's friends, who were disappointed by his lack of decisive victory and his appointment of Peisander as navarch before the disaster of Knidos. The loss of the Spartan fleet besides allowed Konon to capture the island of Kythera, in the south of the Peloponnese, from where he could raid Spartan territory. In 392, Sparta sent Antalcidas to Asia in order to negotiate a general peace with Tiribazus, the satrap of Lydia, while Sparta would recognise Persia's sovereignty over the Asian Greek cities. However, the Greek allies also sent emissaries to Sardis to refuse Antalcidas's plan, and Artaxerxes likewise rejected it. A second peace conference in Sparta failed the following year because of Athens. A personal enemy of Antalcidas, Agesilaus likely disapproved these talks, which show that his influence at home had waned. Plutarch says that he befriended the young Agiad king Agesipolis, possibly to prevent his opponents from coalescing behind him.

By 391 Agesilaus had apparently recovered his influence as he was appointed at the head of the army, while his half-brother Teleutias became navarch. The target was Argos, which had absorbed Corinth into a political union the previous year. In 390 BC he made several successful expeditions into Corinthian territory, capturing Lechaeum and Peiraion. The loss, however, of a battalion (mora), destroyed by Iphicrates, neutralised these successes, and Agesilaus returned to Sparta. In 389 BC he conducted a campaign in Acarnania, but two years later the Peace of Antalcidas, warmly supported by Agesilaus, put an end to the war, maintaining Spartan hegemony over Greece and returning the Greek cities of Asia Minor to the Achaemenid Empire. In this interval, Agesilaus declined command over Sparta's aggression on Mantineia, and justified Phoebidas's seizure of the Theban Cadmea so long as the outcome provided glory to Sparta.

=== Illyrian invasion of Epirus ===
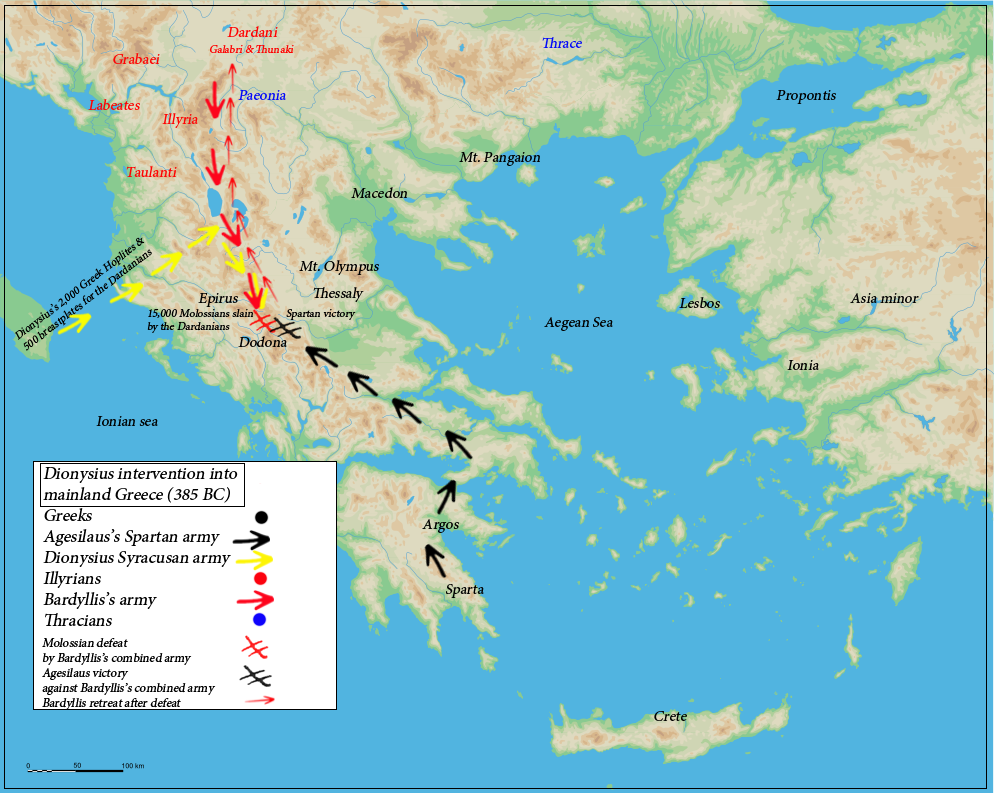
Agesilaus expels the Illyrians from Epirus in 385 BC

In 385 BC, Alcetas of Epirus was a refugee in Syracuse for unknown reasons. The tyrant of Syracuse, Dionysius, wanted a friendly monarch in Epirus, so he sent 2,000 Greek hoplites and 500 suits of Greek armour to help the Illyrians, who at that time were led by king Bardylis, for their battles with the Molossians in Epirus. Attackers killed about 15,000 Molossians. Alcetas was restored to the throne, but the Illyrians didn't stop there. They continued pillaging throughout Epirus and parts of Greece. Dionysius joined them in an attempt to plunder the temple of Delphi. Then, Sparta, supported by Thessaly and Macedonians, intervened under Agesilaus, and expelled the Illyrians and the Syracusan warriors.

=== Decline ===
When war broke out afresh with Thebes, Agesilaus twice invaded Boeotia (in 378 and 377 BC), although he spent the next five years largely out of action due to an unspecified but apparently grave illness. In the congress of 371 an altercation is recorded between him and the Theban general Epaminondas, and due to his influence, Thebes was peremptorily excluded from the peace, and orders given for Agesilaus's royal colleague Cleombrotus to march against Thebes in 371. Cleombrotus was defeated and killed at the Battle of Leuctra and the Spartan supremacy overthrown.

In 370, Agesilaus was engaged in an embassy to Mantineia, and reassured the Spartans with an invasion of Arcadia. He preserved an unwalled Sparta against the revolts and conspiracies of helots, perioeci and even other Spartans; and against external enemies, with four different armies led by Epaminondas penetrating Laconia that same year.

==== Asia Minor expedition (366 BC) ====
In 366 BC, Sparta and Athens, dissatisfied with the Persian king's support of Thebes following the embassy of Philiscus of Abydos, decided to provide careful military support to the opponents of the Achaemenid king. Athens and Sparta provided support for the revolting satraps in the Revolt of the Satraps, in particular Ariobarzanes: Sparta sent a force to Ariobarzanes under an aging Agesilaus, while Athens sent a force under Timotheus, which was however diverted when it became obvious that Ariobarzanes had entered frontal conflict with the Achaemenid king. An Athenian mercenary force under Chabrias was also sent to the Egyptian Pharaoh Tachos, who was also fighting against the Achaemenid king. According to Xenophon, Agesilaus, in order to gain money for prosecuting the war, supported the satrap Ariobarzanes of Phrygia in his revolt against Artaxerxes II in 364 (Revolt of the Satraps).

Again, in 362, Epaminondas almost succeeded in seizing the city of Sparta with a rapid and unexpected march. The Battle of Mantinea, in which Agesilaus took no part, was followed by a general peace: Sparta, however, stood aloof, hoping even yet to recover her supremacy.

==== Expedition to Egypt ====
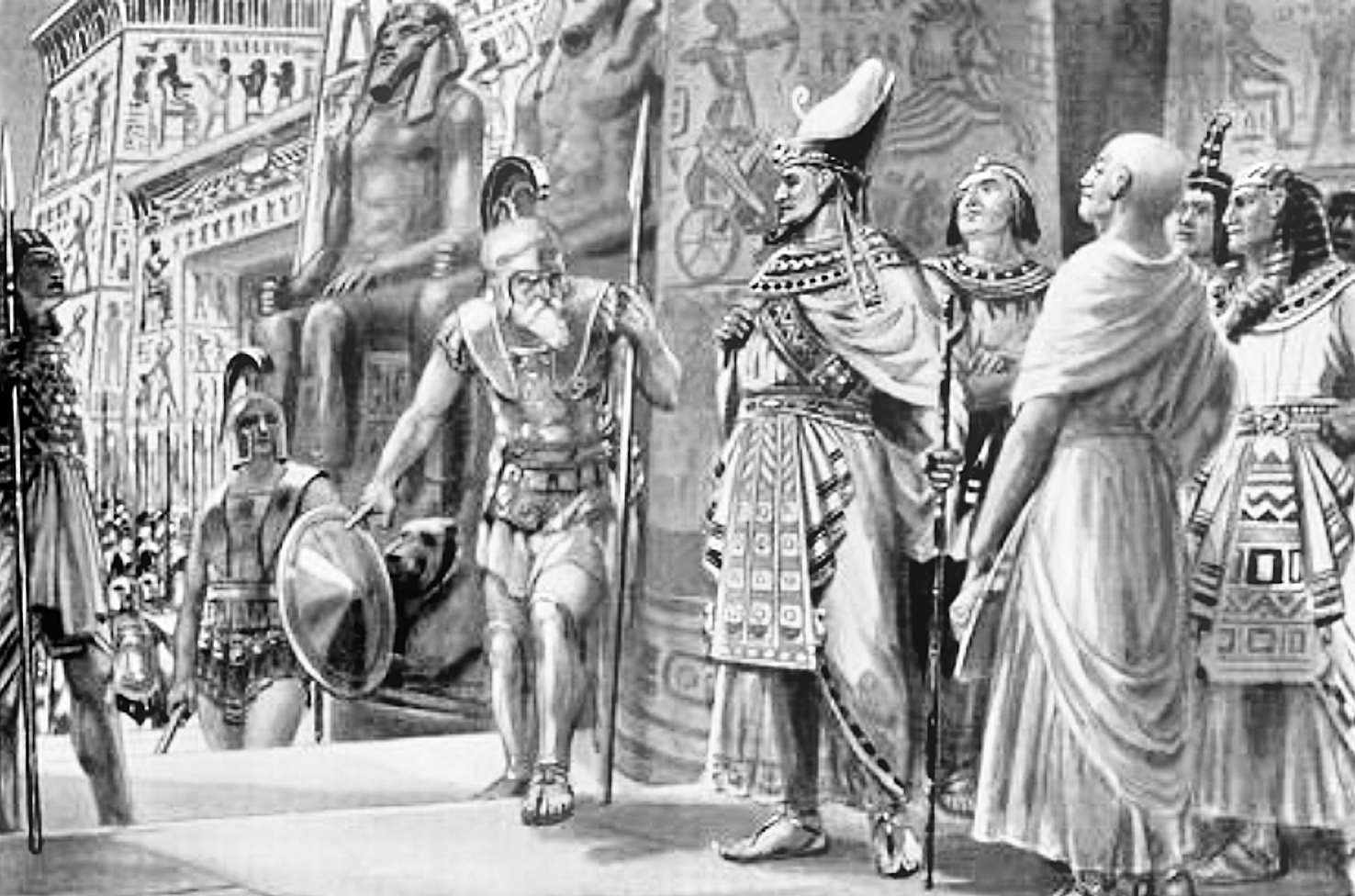
Agesilaus offers his services to the Egyptian pharaoh Teos, Egypt, 361 BC

Sometime after the Battle of Mantineia, Agesilaus went to Egypt at the head of a mercenary force to aid the king Nectanebo I and his regent Teos against Persia. In the summer of 358, he transferred his services to Teos's cousin and rival, Nectanebo II, who, in return for his help, gave him a sum of over 200 talents. On his way home Agesilaus died in Cyrenaica, around the age of 84, after a reign of some 41 years. (Note: Cartledge (1987) and Hamilton (1991) disagreed on Agesilaus's date of death, with the former preferring the winter of 360–59 and the latter that of 359–8. One more recent study, using Egyptian regnal dates, concludes that Nectanebo II seized power in the summer of 358 BC, and that Agesilaus died later that same year, right after the campaigning and sailing season.) His body was embalmed in wax, and buried at Sparta.

He was succeeded by his son Archidamus III.

== Legacy ==
Agesilaus was of small stature and unimpressive appearance, and was lame from birth. These facts were used as an argument against his succession, an oracle having warned Sparta against a "lame reign." Most ancient writers considered him a highly successful leader in guerrilla warfare, alert and quick, yet cautious—a man, moreover, whose personal bravery was rarely questioned in his own time. Of his courage, temperance, and hardiness, many instances are cited, and to these were added the less Spartan qualities of kindliness and tenderness as a father and a friend. As examples, there was the story of his riding a stick-horse with his children and upon being discovered by a friend desiring that the friend not mention what he had seen until he was the father of children; and because of the affection of his son Archidamus for Cleonymus, he saved Sphodrias, Cleonymus's father, from execution for his incursion into Piraeus and dishonourable retreat in 378. Modern writers tend to be slightly more critical of Agesilaus's reputation and achievements, reckoning him an excellent soldier, but one who had a poor understanding of sea power and siege-craft.

As a statesman he won himself both enthusiastic adherents and bitter enemies. Agesilaus was most successful in the opening and closing periods of his reign: commencing but then surrendering a glorious career in Asia; and in extreme age, maintaining his prostrate country. Other writers acknowledge his extremely high popularity at home, but suggest his occasionally rigid and arguably irrational political loyalties and convictions contributed greatly to Spartan decline, notably his unremitting hatred of Thebes, which led to Sparta's humiliation at the Battle of Leuctra and thus the end of Spartan hegemony. Historian J. B. Bury remarks that "there is something melancholy about his career:" born into a Sparta that was the unquestioned continental power of Hellas, the Sparta which mourned him eighty four years later had suffered a series of military defeats which would have been unthinkable to his forebears, had seen its population severely decline, and had run so short of money that its soldiers were increasingly sent on campaigns fought more for money than for defense or glory. Plutarch also describes how often, to remove the threat of instigators of internal dissension, Agesilaus would send his enemies abroad with governorships, where they often were corrupt and procured themselves enemies. Agesilaus would then protect them against these new enemies of theirs, so as to make them his friends. As a result, he no longer had to face internal opposition, as his enemies had henceforth become allies.

As for his personal life, though he had two daughters, Eupolia and Prolyta, and a wife, Cleora, he nonetheless had the habit of forming homosexual "attachments for young men".

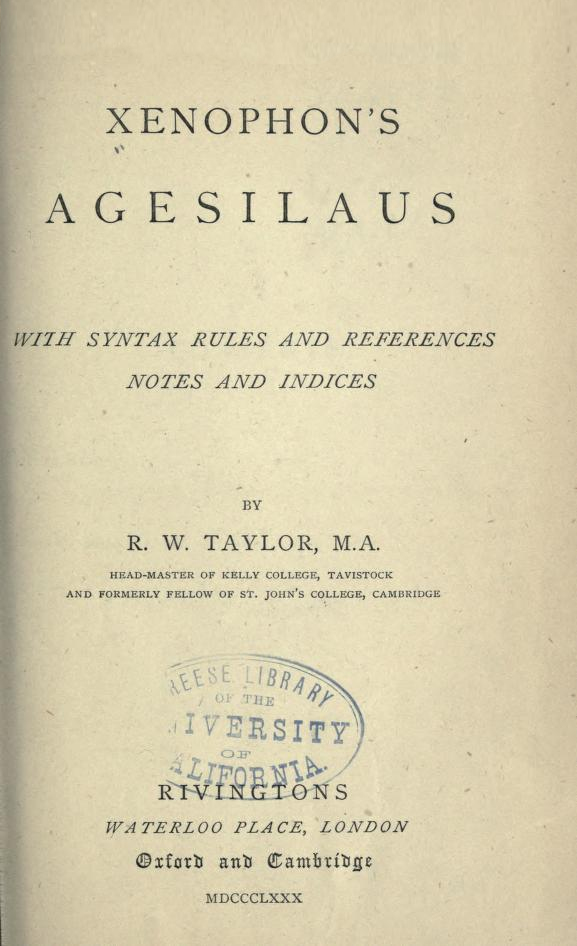
Xenophon's Agesilaus.

Other historical accounts paint Agesilaus as a prototype for the ideal leader. His awareness, thoughtfulness, and wisdom were all traits to be emulated diplomatically, while his bravery and shrewdness in battle epitomised the heroic Greek commander. These historians point towards the unstable oligarchies established by Lysander in the former Athenian Empire and the failures of Spartan leaders (such as Pausanias and Kleombrotos) for the eventual suppression of Spartan power. The ancient historian Xenophon was a huge admirer and served under Agesilaus during the campaigns into Asia Minor.

Plutarch includes among Agesilaus's 78 essays and speeches comprising the apophthegmata Agesilaus's letter to the ephors on his recall:

We have reduced most of Asia, driven back the barbarians, made arms abundant in Ionia. But since you bid me, according to the decree, come home, I shall follow my letter, may perhaps be even before it. For my command is not mine, but my country's and her allies'. And a commander then commands truly according to right when he sees his own commander in the laws and ephors, or others holding office in the state.

And when asked whether Agesilaus wanted a memorial erected in his honour:

If I have done any noble action, that is a sufficient memorial; if I have done nothing noble, all the statues in the world will not preserve my memory. (Note: In Greek: Εἰ γάρ τι καλὸν ἔργον πεποίηκα, τοῦτό μου μνημεῖον ἔσται; εἰ δὲ μή, οὐδ' οἱ πάντες ἀνδριάντες)

Agesilaus lived in the most frugal style alike at home and in the field, and though his campaigns were undertaken largely to secure booty, he was content to enrich the state and his friends and to return as poor as he had set forth.

== Sources ==
=== Ancient sources ===
- Plutarch, Parallel Lives.
- Xenophon, Hellenica.

=== Modern sources ===
- Hans Beck & Peter Funke, Federalism in Greek Antiquity, Cambridge University Press, 2015. ISBN 9780521192262
- Paul Cartledge, Sparta and Lakonia, A Regional History 1300–362 BC, London, Routledge, 1979 (originally published in 1979). ISBN 0-415-26276-3
- ——, Agesilaos and the Crisis of Sparta, Baltimore, Johns Hopkins University Press, 1987.
- George L. Cawkwell, "Agesilaus and Sparta", The Classical Quarterly 26 (1976): 62–84.
- David, Ephraim. Sparta Between Empire and Revolution (404-243 BC): Internal Problems and Their Impact on Contemporary Greek Consciousness. New York: Arno Press, 1981.
- Forrest, W.G. A History of Sparta, 950-192 B.C. 2d ed. London: Duckworth, 1980.
- Dustin A. Gish, "Spartan Justice: The Conspiracy of Kinadon in Xenophon's Hellenika", in Polis, vol. 26, no. 2, 2009, pp. 339–369.
- Hamilton, Charles D. Agesilaus and the Failure of Spartan Hegemony. Ithaca, NY: Cornell University Press, 1991.
- Hamilton, Charles D. Sparta's Bitter Victories: Politics and Diplomacy in the Corinthian War. Ithaca, NY: Cornell University Press, 1979.
- D. M. Lewis, John Boardman, Simon Hornblower, M. Ostwald (editors), The Cambridge Ancient History, vol. VI, The Fourth Century B.C., Cambridge University Press, 1994.
- Pascual, José (2013). "La datación de la ascensión al trono de Esparta de Agesilao II y la cronología de la dinastía XXX egipcia". Gerión. Vol. 30. Complutense University of Madrid. pp. 29–49. doi:10.5209/rev_GERI.2012.v30.41802. ISSN 0213-0181.
- Anton Powell (editor), A Companion to Sparta, Volume I, Hoboken/Chichester, Wiley Blackwell, 2018. ISBN 9781405188692
- D. R. Shipley, A Commentary on Plutarch's Life of Agesilaos: Response to Sources in the Presentation of Character, Oxford, Clarendon Press, 1997. ISBN 9780198150732
- Debby Sneed, "Disability and Infanticide in Ancient Greece", Hesperia: The Journal of the American School of Classical Studies at Athens, Vol. 90, No. 4, 2021, pp. 747–772.
- Maria Stamatopoulou, "Thessalians Abroad, the Case of Pharsalos", in Mediterranean Historical Review, vol. 22.2 (2007), pp. 211–236.
- Graham Wylie, "Agesilaus and the Battle of Sardis", in Klio, n°74 (1992), pp. 118–130.

Regnal titles
Preceded by Agis II	King of Sparta; 400/398–358 BC	Succeeded by Archidamus III
