= Tithraustes =

Early 4th century BC Persian satrap of Sardis

Tithraustes (Old Persian: *Ciθravahištah; Ancient Greek: Τιθραύστης, romanized: Tithraústēs) was the Persian satrap of Sardis for several years in the early 4th century BC. Due to scanty historical records, little is known of the man or his activities. He was sent out from Susa to replace Tissaphernes in 395 BC, and, after arresting his predecessor, executed him.

To remove the threat to his satrapy posed by the Spartan army of Agesilaus, Tithraustes persuaded Agesilaus to march north into the satrapy of Pharnabazus, and provided him with money for the march. After this event, no further actions of his can be traced.

Xenophon states that it was Tithraustes who dispatched Timocrates of Rhodes to Greece to stir up opposition to Sparta, but this seems unlikely for chronological reasons.
