= Battle of Cnidus =

394 BCE naval engagement between the Achaemenid Empire and Sparta

- Part of Corinthian War
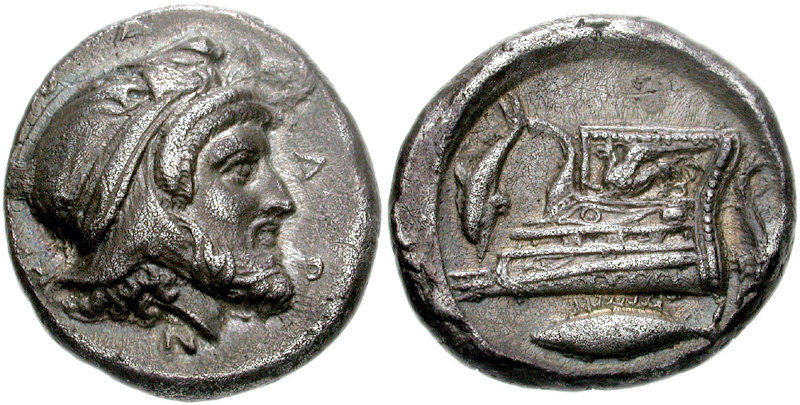
- Achaemenid satrap Pharnabazus II, in joint command with self-exiled Athenian admiral Conon, was victorious against Sparta at the Battle of Cnidus. Coinage of Pharnabazus, circa 398-396/395 BC, showing his portrait and the prow of a warship with two dolphins, symbol of his achievement on the sea.
Date	394 BC
Location	Off the coast of Cnidus, in the Aegean Sea (modern-day Yazıköy, Muğla, Turkey) 36°41′09″N 27°22′30″E
Result	Achaemenid victory

Belligerents
Achaemenid Empire	Sparta

Commanders and leaders
Pharnabazus; Conon	Peisander †

Strength
90 triremes	85 triremes

Casualties and losses
Minimal	Entire fleet
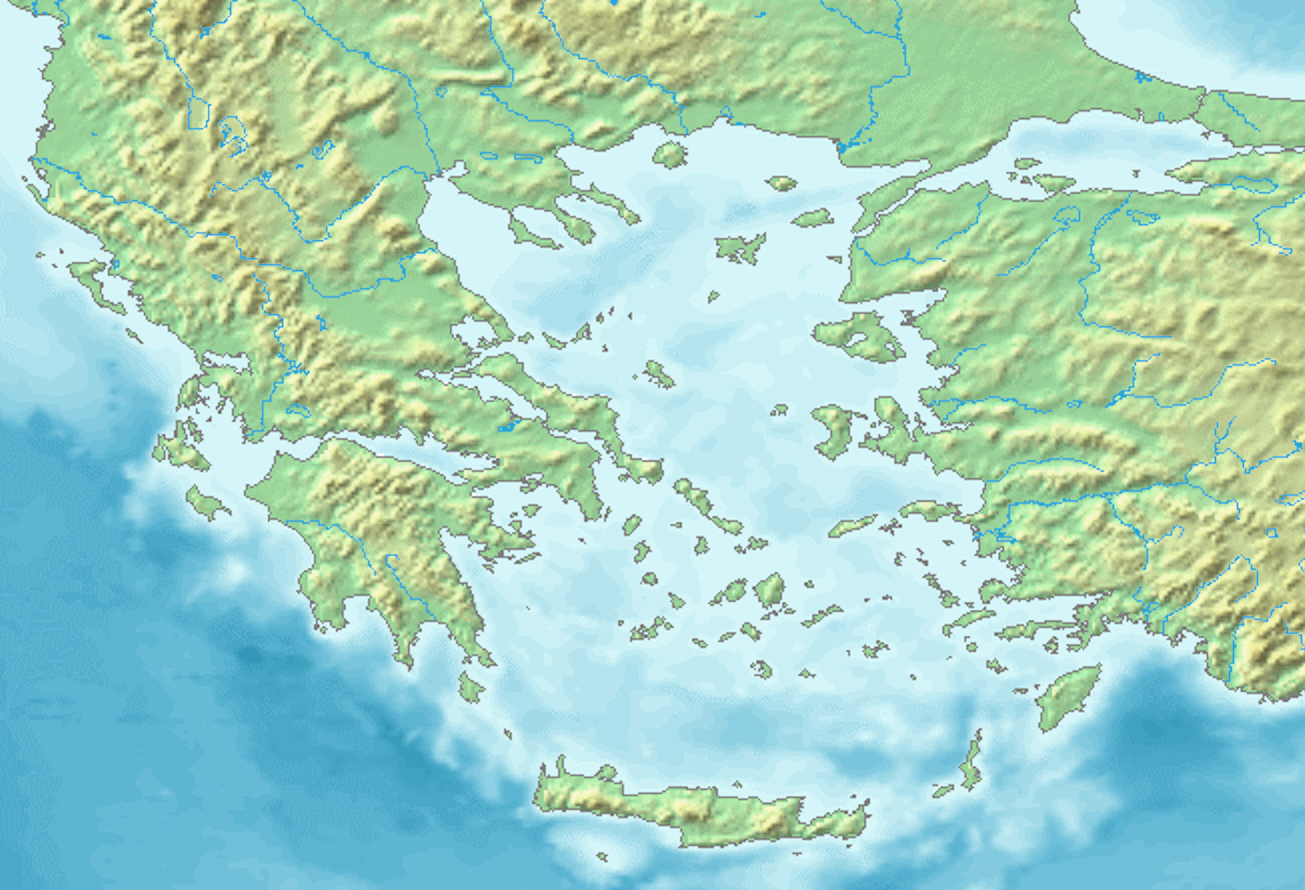
- Location of the Battle of Cnidus

The Battle of Cnidus (Greek: Ναυμαχία της Κνίδου) was a military operation conducted in 394 BC by the Achaemenid Empire against the Spartan fleet during the Corinthian War. A fleet under the joint command of Pharnabazus and former Athenian admiral, Conon, destroyed the Spartan fleet led by the inexperienced Peisander, ending Sparta's brief bid for naval supremacy.

The battle outcome was a significant boost for the anti-Spartan coalition that resisted Spartan hegemony in the course of the Corinthian War.

== Prelude ==
In 394 BC, King Agesilaus II of Sparta and his army were recalled from Ionia to help fight the Corinthian War. The Spartan fleet, under Peisander, also began a return to Greece, sailing out from its harbor at Cnidus with eighty-five triremes.

The "Greek" vanguard of the Achaemenid fleet, referred to as such only due to its consisting of Greek mercenaries, was commanded by Conon, while the Persian satrap Pharnabazus led the main body of the forces, a Phoenician fleet from the Chersonese, to oppose the Spartans. The fleets met near Cnidus. According to Isocrates, King Evagoras I of Cyprus contributed the greatest part of the forces under Conon for the sea fight off Cnidus.

== Battle ==
Sources are vague for the events of the battle itself. It appears that the Spartan fleet encountered advance elements of the Achaemenid fleet under Conon and engaged them with some success. Then the main body of the Persian fleet arrived and put the Spartans to flight, forcing them to beach many of their ships. The Spartans suffered heavy casualties; according to Diodorus Siculus, fifty Spartan triremes were captured by the Persians while the remaining triremes safely returned to Cnidus. Peisander saw retreat as disgraceful towards Sparta and was ultimately killed while fighting to defend his ship.

== Aftermath ==
This battle ended the Spartans' attempt to establish a naval empire. Sparta never again engaged in major military efforts at sea, and within a few years Athens had reclaimed her place as the preeminent Greek sea power.

Following his victory, Conon raided the coast of the Peloponnese with Pharnabazus in order to put pressure on Sparta, and then was sent with his fleet to Athens, where he supervised the rebuilding of the long walls, which had been destroyed at the end of the Peloponnesian War. According to Pausanias, Conon commemorated the victory by establishing a sanctuary of Aphrodite (the patron goddess of Cnidus and a key deity for the Phoenicians) in Piraeus.

With Sparta removed from the scene, Persia re-established its dominance over Ionia and parts of the Aegean. The Peace of Antalcidas in 387 BC officially ceded control of these areas to Persia; it would continue to hold them until the arrival of Alexander the Great half a century later.
