= Rathines =

Cadusii leader (fl. 4th c. BC)

Rathines (Ancient Greek: Ῥαθίνης, lat.: Rathínēs or Rathánēs) - the leader of the Cadusii and general of Pharnabazus III.

== History ==
Xenophon wrote a full description of the tactical use of the Persian cavalry columns on the example of a skirmish at Dascylium in 396 BC: ...when the Spartan king Agesilaus was not far from Dascylium, his horsemen, walking in front of him, galloped to the top of the hill to see if there was anything ahead. And, by chance, the horsemen of Pharnabazus III, who were under the command of Rathines and Bancaeus, his bastard brother, and approximately equal in number to the Greek cavalry, were sent by Pharnabazus and also galloped to the same hill. And when both detachments saw each other at a distance of no more than 4 pletras [about 120 m], at first both stood, the Greek horsemen - being lined up four in depth, like a phalanx, and the barbarians - along the front no more than twelve, but more in depth. However, then the barbarians attacked. When they engaged in hand-to-hand combat, all the Greeks who had stabbed anyone broke their spears, while the barbarians, armed with dogwood darts, quickly killed twelve men and two horses. Following this, the Greeks were put to flight. But when Agesilaus came to the rescue with the hoplites, the barbarians retreated again and one of them was killed.
