= Peisander (navarch) =

Spartan admiral (died 395 BC)

Peisander (/paɪˈsændər, ˈpaɪˌsændər/; Greek: Πείσανδρος) was a Spartan admiral during the Corinthian War. In 395 BC, he was placed in command of the Spartan fleet in the Aegean by his brother-in-law, the king Agesilaus II. Peisander was a relatively inexperienced general, and in its very first action his Spartan fleet was decisively defeated at the Battle of Cnidus. Peisander died fighting aboard his ship.
