= Phoebidas =

4th-century BC Spartan general

Phoebidas (Greek: Φοιβίδας) was a Spartan general who, in 382 BC, seized the Theban acropolis, thus giving Sparta control over Thebes. As punishment for his unauthorized action, Phoebidas was relieved of command. Nevertheless, the Spartans continued to hold Thebes. The Spartan king Agesilaus argued against punishing Phoebidas, on the grounds that his actions had benefitted Sparta, arguing that that was the only standard by which he should be judged.

In 378 BC, the Thebans tried to take Thespiae, but were beaten back by Phoebidas who was serving as the harmost of Thespiae. When the Thebans retreated Phoebidas sallied out, he lost 500 soldiers while he himself was killed by cavalry under the command of the Theban general Gorgidas.

Several years later, Phoebidas's actions appear to have been the model for a similar action by another general, Sphodrias, who attempted to seize Piraeus, the port of Athens.

Phoebidas was the father of Isidas, a Spartan youth of remarkable beauty who stood out for fighting naked against the Thebans in Sparta.
