= Common Peace =

4th century BC Greek political concept

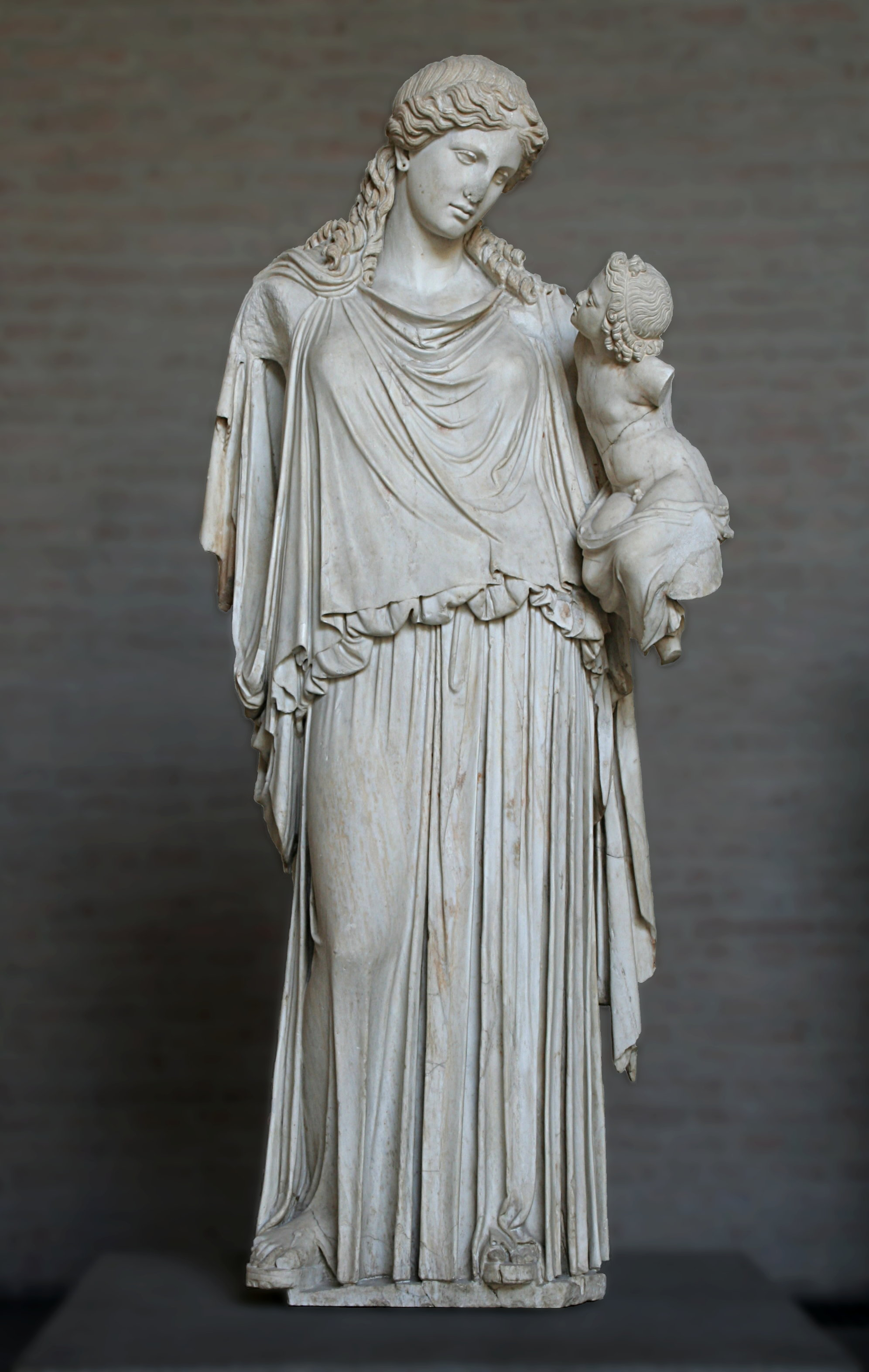
The Greek goddess Eirene, personification of peace, holds Plutos, the god of wealth, in her arms (Roman copy of a statue by Cephisodotus; Athens c. 370 BC

The idea of the Common Peace (Κοινὴ Εἰρήνη, Koinē Eirēnē) was one of the most influential concepts of 4th century BC Greek political thought, along with the idea of Panhellenism. The term described both the concept of a desirable, permanent peace between the Greek city-states (poleis) and a sort of peace treaty which fulfilled the three fundamental criteria of this concept: it had to include all the Greek city-states, it had to recognise the autonomy and equality of all city states without regard for their military power, and it had to be intended to remain in force permanently.

The advocates of the Common Peace saw it as a way to end the endemic warfare which engulfed the Greek poleis after the outbreak of the Peloponnesian War in 431 BC. From the King's Peace of 387/6 BC down to the foundation of the League of Corinth in 338 BC, the idea of the Common Peace influenced all peace treaties between Greek poleis. In the end, however, it turned out that only a strong hegemonic power could maintain a comprehensive peace for long. The concept has been revived in modern times, and in the 20th century it was a foundation stone of international organisations like the League of Nations and the United Nations.

== The idea of the Common Peace ==
The idea of the Common Peace developed out of older ideas which had gradually taken form in the political interactions of the 5th century BC in Greece. Its temporary enforcement however owes less to the realisation of the need for a permanent peace, than to the fact that it seemed to serve the interests of several successive hegemonic powers. The history of the Common Peace is therefore part not only of the history of ideas, but also of the diplomatic history of Greece in the decades between the Peloponnesian War and the rise of Philip II of Macedon.

=== Development of the term ===
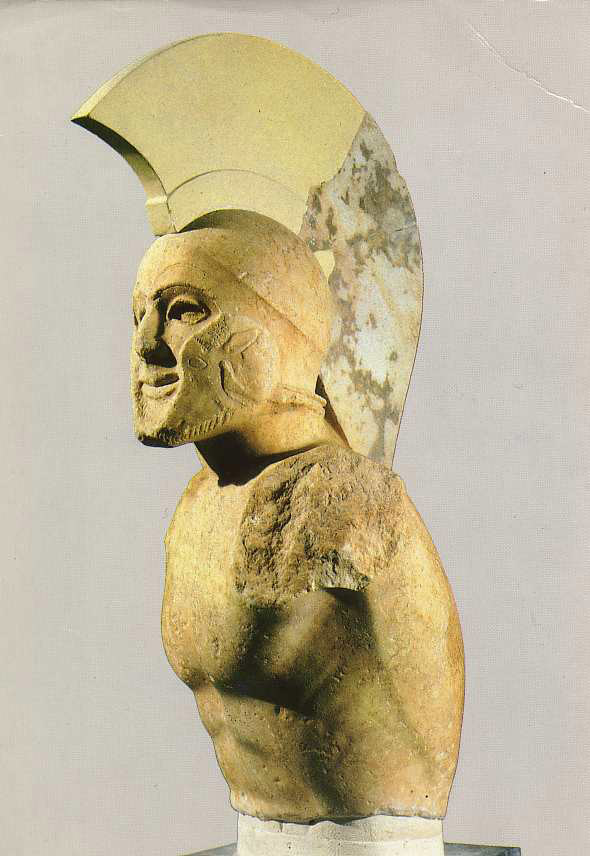
Spartan hoplite

The Greek word Eirene, which originally only signified a "state of peace", developed the related meaning of "peace agreement" at the beginning of the 4th century BC. This was a consequence of a change in attitudes to war and peace more generally. Already in the 5th century BC, wars between Greek poleis were ended with treaties, which were known as spondai (σπονδαί), synthekai (συνθῆκαι) or dialyseis polemou (διαλύσεις πολέμου). All these terms ultimately only indicated a truce or temporary break from war. But as a result of the unending warfare from the middle of that century, the idea gradually developed that a state of peace rather than war should be the normal state of international affairs. This is reflected in the increased prominence of the term Eirene and in its use as a term for peace treaties.

The term "Common Peace" was first used in 391 BC, in reference to the failed negotiations between Athens and Sparta to end the Corinthian War. The Athenian politician Andocides advised his fellow citizens in a speech to accept a settlement which he called koine eirene. The term may had already come into general parlance before, but this speech is the first attestation. The first treaty in which the terms eirene and koine eirene were actually used was the King's Peace imposed by the Spartans and Persians in 387/6 BC. The phrase koine eirene only appears in an official document for the first time in the peace treaty made after the Battle of Mantinea in 362 BC.

Generally, the term koine eirene is only sparsely attested in contemporary sources. Authors like Isocrates, Demosthenes and Xenophon do not use it at all. But they do refer to its essential characteristics for each of the peace treaties which the first century BC historian Diodorus consistently refers to as a koine eirene. The fact that Diodorus based his account of the period from 386 to 361 BC on the contemporary author Ephorus makes it very likely that the term was in general use at the time. It also appears in mid-4th century BC inscription from Argos, known as the Reply to the Satraps, whose exact date and circumstances are unclear.

=== Characteristics ===
In the speech of Andocides and the provisions of the King's Peace two characteristics are revealed which were new for peace treaties at this time. One of these was that all Greek poleis (with a few exceptions) were to be autonomous. The other was that each of these draft treaties were sent to all poleis. Peace is therefore no longer presented as a bilateral agreement between two formerly hostile poleis or leagues, but as a multilateral treaty, which would also encompass all the parties that were not involved in the conflict, as far as possible.

A third characteristic is not explicitly mentioned but can be inferred from the absence of a set time limit. In the 5th century, it was the norm for peace treaties to have a specified period of validity. The Thirty Years' Peace of 446/5 BC between Athens and Sparta was named for the period of time it was expected to last. The Peace of Nicias of 421 BC was meant to last for fifty years, while treaties with a set period of one hundred years were practically intended to last forever. This derives from the idea that peace was not being made between the states as such, but rather between their populations, and thus the longest possible period of time that a treaty could last was the lifetime of a single generation – which could only make agreements for itself, not its descendants. By contrast, a koine eirene was in principle designed to endure forever. Although this was not actually explicitly stated in the treaties, it is clear from the internal logic of the autonomy clauses, since an independence with chronological limits would not be independence.

==== Multilaterality ====
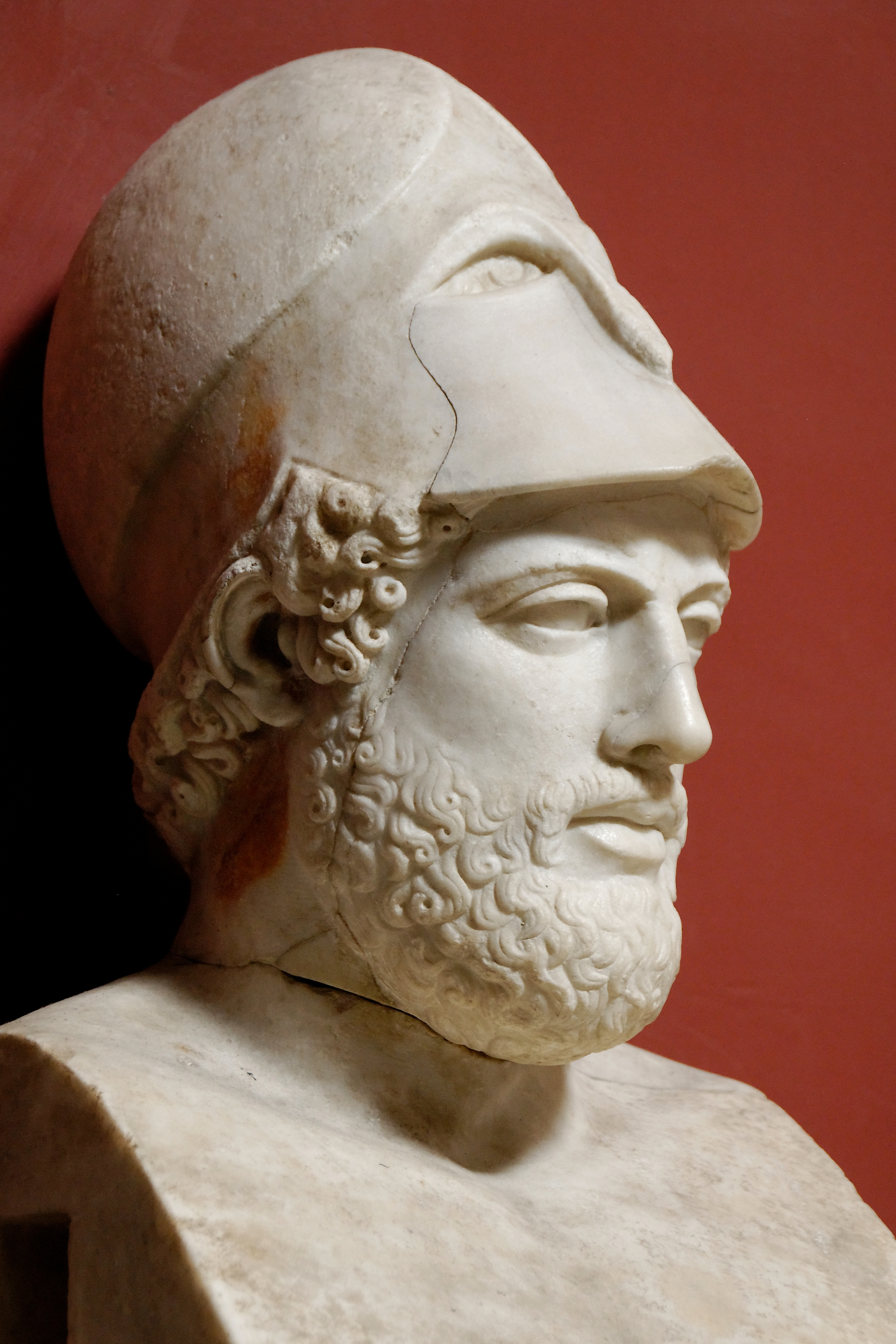
Bust of Pericles

The bilateral peace treaties of the 5th century BC between Athens and Sparta largely ignored the interests of other parties – including their own allies, who were not even consulted. Even the treaty of 404 BC, which ended the Peloponnesian War and was in practice a diktat from the Spartan side, was formally a treaty between Sparta and Athens. It did not contain any terms regarding the allies of Athens in the Delian League and was actually concluded despite the opposition of the Spartans' allies. The treaty therefore entirely reflects the conditions and ideas of the 5th century BC, in which there were only two major hegemonic powers in Greece, to which all other poleis were subordinated.

The idea of a multilateral pan-Hellenic agreement was not actually new, however. After the defeat of Xerxes' invasion, a general peace had been concluded in 481 BC, although it was temporary. In 450 BC, Pericles is reported to have desired to convene a general peace conference in Athens. It is reported that the refusal of the Spartans to participate on account of their fear of Athenian hegemony meant that it never actually took place. Apart from some multilateral treaties between individual poleis in Sicily and Ionia, the religious association of the Amphictyonic League was the only multilateral agreement of ancient Greece which was enduring and significant. The Amphictyonic oath forswore the destruction of member states in war or the removal of their water. Poleis that broke this oath would themselves be threatened with destruction. This might be a forerunner of the koine eirene.

That it became ever more common to make peace treaties on the basis of a koine eirene after 387 BC had a practical aspect. The successive hegemonic powers were not individual poleis, but several opposing poleis or leagues of roughly equal strength. With them, peace was only possible if all agreed together. For the general acceptance of such a multilateral agreement, the autonomy clause was the first requirement.

==== Autonomy clause ====
The Greek term autonomia signified the right and ability of the citizens of a polis to use their own legal system or nomos (νόμος) and to be free from all submission to other poleis. Since the polis had become the characteristic form of the state in Greece, there was an unwritten law in their relationships with one another that each of them – even the most insignificant ones – should be autonomous. The only exceptions to this were the small cities of Attica and Laconia, which had long been completely integrated into the Athenian and Spartan poleis, respectively. It was a source of substantial tension in the 4th century, when the Thebans attempted to incorporate the cities of Boeotia into a single polis in the same way.

Following the Persian Wars, however, the willingness to form leagues (called koina or symmachiai) under the leadership of a hegemonic power increased. These were entered into voluntarily, so that the principle of autonomy was theoretically not infringed. But as the Persian threat declined in significance, it seemed that the Athenians wished to convert the Delian League which they controlled into a naval empire which they ruled. Thus the Athenians violated the foundations of autonomia: the freedom of poleis to live under their own political systems, to be free of garrisons, cleruchies, external legal jurisdiction, and tribute. The introduction of phoros (φόρος, i.e. contributions for military purposes), the relocation of league's treasury from Delos to Athens and the forced introduction of democratic constitutions based on the Athenian model in some members of the league all seemed to violate the principle of autonomia.

The Spartans, whose Peloponnesian League was loosely organised in comparison, began to use the demand for autonomia as a diplomatic means to weaken the Delian League from the middle of the 5th century BC. They took up the complaints of the Athenians' allies as their own: during and after the Peloponnesian War, the Spartans presented themselves as the protectors of the freedom of all Greek states. Thus, the autonomy clause was a key component of every Common Peace not only because smaller poleis saw it as a way to ensure their independence, but also and more importantly because larger powers could use it to advance their own interests.

== Development of the Common Peace ==
Whether a peace agreement was a Common Peace or not is uncertain for some treaties. In the following, a wide definition is used in order to make the development of the idea of the Common Peace clear. Criteria for inclusion are the autonomy clause and the permission for all Greek poleis to join, regardless of whether that option was actually taken up.

=== Failed peace of 391 BC ===
In 392/1 BC, in the course of the Corinthian War, Sparta submitted an initial peace offer to the Persian satrap of Lydia, Tiribazus. The Spartans were under pressure to extract themselves from their hopeless war in Asia Minor and simultaneously reassert their military supremacy in mainland Greece. For this it was necessary, firstly, to concede Persian control of the Greek cities of Ionia, and secondly, to end the Persians' alliances with the Greek opponents of Sparta, especially Athens. Simultaneously, the Great King needed to be convinced that no new Greek power would form in the Aegean which might challenge Persian control of the Ionian cities.

The agreement that would solve all these problems was that Sparta and Persia would guarantee the autonomy of all Greek states (except those in Asia Minor). The Spartans would then have been able to point to the protection of a generally recognised principle as the outcome of the war. At the same time, this would allow the Spartans to split the Greek world into a number of weak individual states, ensuring Spartan hegemony and satisfying the Persian desire for security. The Greek city-states naturally rejected the treaty out of hand. The Persian king Artaxerxes II was also inclined to reject it. He recalled Tiribazus and replaced him with a new satrap, Struthas, who strengthened the Persian alliance with Athens.

A few months later, the Spartans attempted to come to terms with their Greek enemies in a conference in their own capital. Once more, they made the autonomy principle the basis of any agreement, this time with concessions to Athens and Thebes. The Athenians would have retained the islands of Lemnos, Imbros, and Skyros, while the Thebans' possession of Orchomenus would have been recognised.

It was during these negotiations that the formula of a 'Common Peace' for all Greeks was first used. The Athenian orator Andocides used it in a speech, in which he vainly urged his countrymen to accept the Spartan offer:

Consider this too, Athenians: right now you are negotiating peace and freedom common to all the Greeks and causing everyone to share control over everything.

— Andocides, On the Peace 17

Andocides made a distinction between treaties and a real peace. He invoked pan-Hellenism, while idealising the project of the common peace. As he did this, however, he omitted the fact that the Ionian cities for whose freedom Athens had gone to war with Persia some hundred years earlier, would be abandoned as a result of this treaty. In the end the Athenians rejected the treaty because of this (and because after their alliance with Struthas, they believed they were in a stronger position).

=== Peace of Antalcidas ===
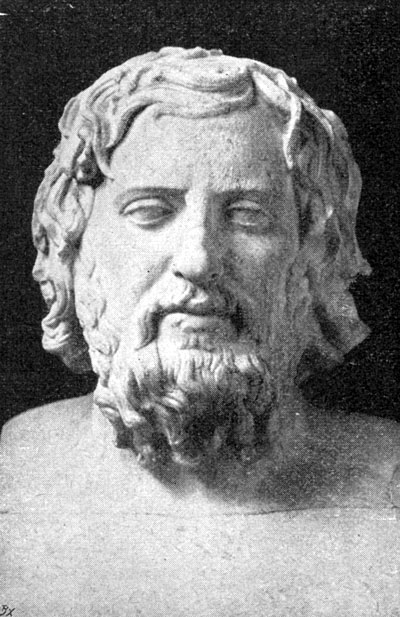
Xenophon

The successes of the Athenian fleet in 390 BC, however, led to a reevaluation at the Persian court, which did not want the Athenians to get too strong. Struthas was replaced two years later by his predecessor Tiribazus, who negotiated a peace with the Spartan envoy Antalcidas. The resulting agreement, known as the Peace of Antalcidas or the King's Peace, essentially accepted the Spartan proposals of 392/1 BC. The most important terms were the inclusion of all Greek states and the guarantee of their freedom and autonomy. Only the Ionian cities, Cyprus and Clazomenae, which remained under Persian control, and the three aforementioned islands under Athenian rule were excluded. The Athenians had to surrender all other possessions, and the dissolution of all leagues was the unavoidable consequence of the treaty. The key passage comes from Xenophon, whose Hellenica is the most important source for this period:

Artaxerxes the king thinks it is just that the cities in Asia be his as well as the islands of Clazomenae and Cyprus, but that all the Greek cities great and small should be allowed to be autonomous, except for Lemnos, Imbros, and Scyros, which should be Athenian, as of old. And if anybody does not accept this peace, I will go to war against them, with those who want these things, on foot and by sea, with ships and with money.

— Xenophon, Hellenica 5.1.31

Most scholars see the Peace of Antalcidas as the first example of a Common Peace. Hermann Bengtson viewed the Common Peace as a side-effect of the treaty, which was originally only a decree of the Great King (hence its name). The Spartans were appointed as guardians (prostatai) of the peace, with the power to interpret and enforce its provisions. All the Greek states swore to abide by this decree at Sparta – in light of the Great King's threat to go to war with anyone who refused to do so. This fact and the aforementioned exceptions show that a Common Peace was not fully achieved. Nor would one be achieved subsequently. While the autonomy and the inclusion of all cities was guaranteed, they were entirely dependent on the interests of those same powers which initiated and guaranteed the Common Peace.

Artaxerxes did not intend to provide Greece with an enduring peace, but to divide and weaken it politically. The Spartans displayed a desire for peace, but also a wish to ensure their own hegemony. The Spartan interpretation of autonomy required the dissolution of all leagues except their own Peloponnesian League, since this was not unified or centrally organised, but instead was a system of bilateral treaties which the Spartans had made with each individual member. In the Spartan view, bilateral treaties between individual states were not included in the ban on leagues controlled by a hegemonic power, although in practice this was exactly what the Peloponnesian League was.

Therefore, the Spartans remained the strongest military power in Greece. Under the pretext of protecting the autonomy principle, they maintained a hegemonic position over the next few years which greatly abused the autonomy of other states, such as the Chalcidian League and the city of Mantinea.

=== The Common Peace of 375 BC ===
In 382 BC, the Spartans seized the Cadmea, the citadel of Thebes, whose increasing strength was a thorn in their side. This act cost them what remained of their reputation as protectors of autonomy and led to the Boeotian War with the Thebans and their Athenian allies. In the course of this, in spring 377 BC, the Second Athenian Confederacy was established. This league represented a violation of the clauses of the Peace of Antalcidas. But it is possible that a majority of the Aegean islands and coastal states now saw Athens as a better advocate of the principle of autonomy, as a result of their support for Thebes. The league treaty was explicitly concluded:

for the good fortune of the Athenians and the allies of the Athenians: so that the Spartans shall allow the Greeks to be free and autonomous and to live at peace, possessing securely all their own (territory), [[and so that [the peace and the friendship which the Greeks] and the King [swore] shall be in force [and endure] in accordance with the 15 agreements]]

— Rhodes & Osborne, Greek Historical Inscriptions 404–323 BC (2007), no 22.

The Athenians had thus taken clever advantage of the situation and the restoration of the naval confederacy clearly brought with it the undertaking to maintain the King's Peace. It had taken less than 30 years of Spartan hegemony to reverse attitudes on the Athenian empire. The first league had been presented as a threat to autonomy, but the second was claimed to be its protector. In order to prevent the Athenians from again assuming a hegemonic position, the new league was organised in accordance with the principles of the Common Peace. This is a sign that these principles were generally accepted by this time.

When the war stagnated in 375 BC, a willingness to make peace developed in both Sparta and Athens. The Spartans could no longer hope for a victory and the Athenians had achieved their goals: the freedom of Thebes from Spartan control and the recognition of the sea league as compatible with the terms of the Peace of Antalcidas. Diodorus reports an embassy of the Great King came to secure a renewal of the peace, since the Persians needed to free up Greek mercenaries for a war they wanted to undertake in Egypt. The Greek states accepted the agreement and the Common Peace was renewed.

At this point, the Common Peace was extended in one respect: as already foreseen in the terms of the Second Athenian Confederacy, it was required that all foreign garrisons be removed from all cities. This was directed particularly at the Spartans who had garrisons in some south Boeotian cities, such as Thespiae (actually at their request, as protection against Thebes). The Thebans were thus the main beneficiaries of the Common Peace of 375 BC. The Spartans had begun the war on the same grounds that the Athenians now wished to end it: to prevent the further growth of Theban power. However, in the end the departure of the Spartan troops on the pretext of respecing the autonomy principle left the Thebans with a free hand in Boeotia. Even so, the Athenians were clearly on the winning side: their success lay in the recognition of a new confederacy. Neither the Spartans nor the Persians could do anything about this, unlike 10 years earlier.

Despite the Persian diplomatic involvement, the Common Peace of 375 BC can be seen as the first which derived principally from Greek initiative and in which all parties were of roughly equal strength and thus received equal terms. For the first time, a peaceful system seemed to be possible without enforcement by a hegemonic power.

=== Failed negotiations of 371 BC ===
Two opposing political groups had already developed in Athens before the treaty of 375 BC: one sought an agreement with Sparta, the other a strengthening of the alliance with Thebes. However, the anti-Spartan forces over-estimated Athens' position after the peace and supported a democratic insurgency against the government of the island of Corcyra, which was allied with Sparta. Thus the Spartans, who were anything but satisfied with the result of the preceding clashes, already had grounds to go back to war a year and a half after the peace. At the same time, the situation was further complicated by the fact that Thebes destroyed the city of Plataea in 374/3 BC, which had an ancient alliance with Athens and had also been allied with Sparta since 380 BC. The Spartans therefore sent troops to Phocis, to threaten Thebes and undo the failures of the preceding years. Thus, 371 BC once more saw the outbreak of a general conflict.

In Athens, however, the moderate politicians considered the best outcome for their city to lie in a policy of neutrality and proposed a new Common Peace. To support Thebes would decisively strengthen their position. Support of Sparta, on the other hand, would have alarmed their allies, who saw them as a threat to their right to autonomy. Further factors were also relevant: if the Spartans refused the proposed league, the Athenians would have been forced to fight two wars at once. Therefore, the Athenians decided to overlook the fate of Plataea and invited the Thebans to a peace conference in Sparta. The Spartans were even more willing to make peace now, since their actions in Phocis had been unsuccessful. Threatening Thebes thus became unlikely, but the Spartans did not consider themselves to be in any danger.

The Common Peace which was now proposed at the initiative of the Athenians again saw critical innovation. The Athenian interpretation of autonomy prevailed, and according to Xenophon, the Spartans committed to removing all their harmosts from cities of the peace. This was a difficult situation, since after 375 BC, only the cities in the Peloponnese (Sparta's chief area of influence) were relevant. Even more important for the continued development of the idea of peace were rules which provided for all sides to demobilise their troops and fleets and which allowed the treaty partners to help one another in the event of an attack. The final clause, which did not impose a duty to help, was included at Athenian request. They intended to use it later to maintain the possibility of holding the balance of power between the other two powers.

Considered in isolation, this peace treaty could be taken as a skilled piece of Athenian diplomacy. But since it never actually came into effect, it can only be speculated whether it could have formed the basis of an enduring peace. After all, the treaty partners had taken account of the idea that sufficient force needed to be made available for use against potential treaty breakers in order to maintain the peace. In the Peace of Antalcidas, this had been accomplished by the threat of the Great King. In an agreement between free states, it had to be an agreement to oppose an attack on a treaty partner together.

At the planned swearing of the treaty, however, a serious rift arose between Thebes and Sparta. The Theban envoys had initially sworn to the agreement in the name of their own city and allowed that name to be placed on the treaty. But the next day, they demanded that the name of Thebes be replaced with that of the Boeotian League, since they claimed to be entitled to represent it. The Spartans categorically rejected this, since in their view the Boeotian cities ought to be autonomous. The split led to war and only twenty days later, the Spartans lost the Battle of Leuctra, which proved to be the first Spartan defeat in open battle and decisively altered the balance of power in Greece in Thebes' favour.

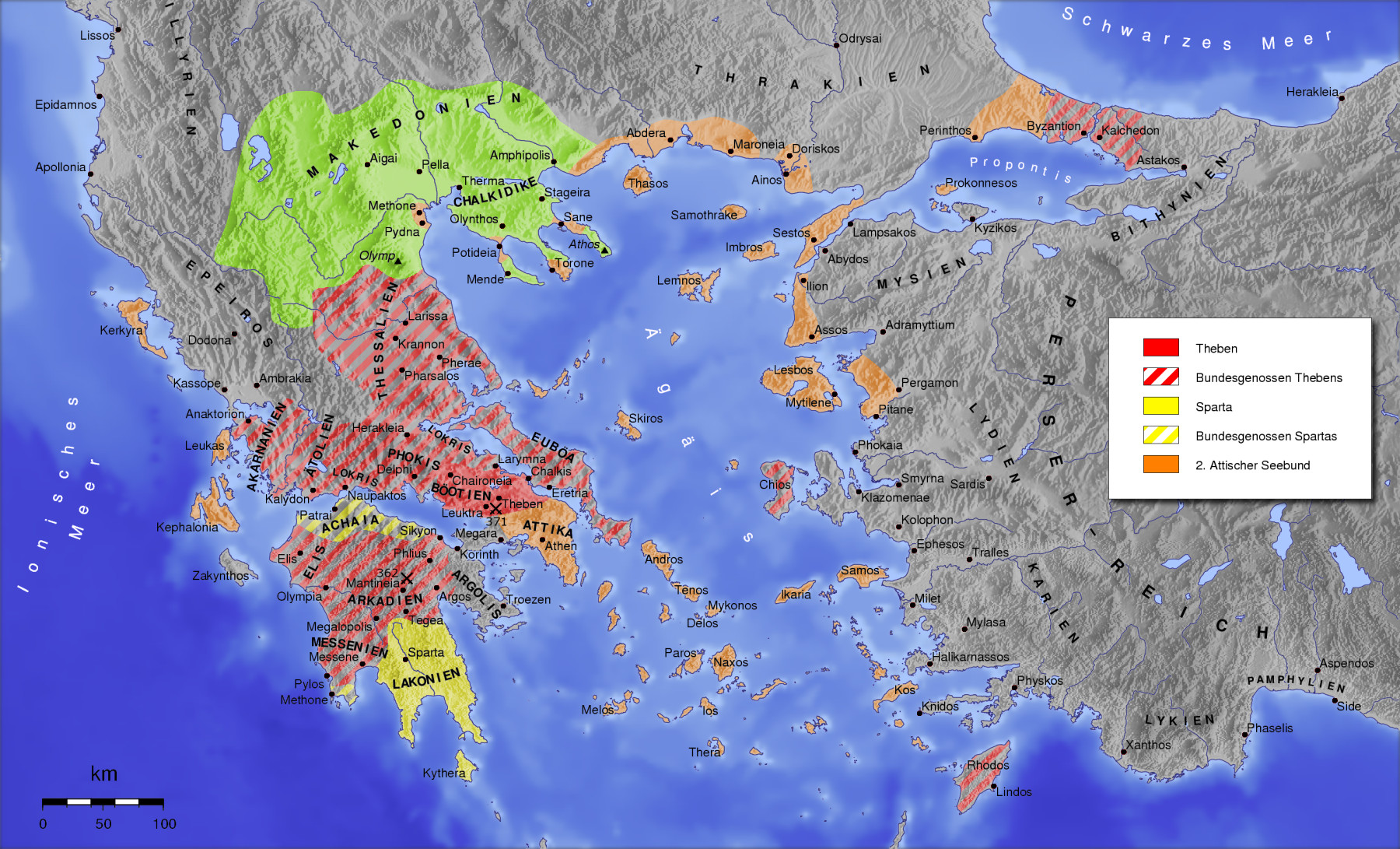
Greece during the Theban Hegemony, 371–362 BC.

After the battle, military activity ceased. At first, the Thebans undertook no further military action against the Spartans, who eventually sent troops to the Isthmus of Corinth to ward off any chance of a Theban attack on the Peloponnese. In this situation, the Athenians seized the initiative and called a peace conference, at which they could swear to the Common Peace once more and negotiate a new treaty. This was motivated by the desire to prevent further increase in Theban power. An innovation in this new peace treaty was that the possibility of aiding a treaty partner in attacking a disturber of the peace was transformed into a duty. This was a logical development of the previous failed peace and was found at the start of all future Common Peace treaties. Some researchers see the second treaty of 371 BC as the foundation of a military alliance (symmachia), as a result of this duty to intervene.

The Spartans joined this new agreement immediately for their own sake. Their neighbours, the Eleans, had already sought to take advantage of the defeat of Sparta, and they refused to recognise the autonomy of some of their border cities, which they had given up in 399 BC under Spartan compulsion, but had retaken after Leuctra. Fatally, the Thebans did not agree to the treaty, since a Common Peace was inconsistent with their ambitions for their newly won hegemony. H. Bengtson saw this Common Peace as nothing more than an Athenian "gesture against Thebes, without practical value."

If the idea of the Common Peace had any chance to be based on equal rights for all states, it was in the short period between 375 BC and the Battle of Leuctra. Only then were there three Greek powers of roughly equal strength such that the strongest could be controlled by an alliance of the other two. Before and after this there was a clearly dominant hegemonic power (first Sparta, then Thebes) which either sought to use the Common Peace for its own purposes or rejected it altogether. Both approaches led to further military conflict. With the failure of the negotiations of 371 BC, the concept of the Common Peace largely lost credence as part of a practical policy.

=== Peace treaties of 368 and 366 BC ===
In the year after Leuctra, the Thebans clearly established their hegemony. Through a campaign into the Peloponnese, they established the independence of the Messenians, who had been ruled by the Spartans for centuries, and supported the establishment of the Arcadian League. A further war against an alliance of Sparta, Athens and Dionysius I of Syracuse proved inconclusive. Thus in 369/8 BC, all the Greek states responded to the call to meet in a peace conference at Delphi, issued by Ariobarzanes, the satrap of Phrygia. However, the negotiations foundered in the face of the Spartans' refusal to accept Messenian independence – a position which was supported by the Athenians and by the Persian representative, Philiscus. Since Ariobarzanes went into rebellion against the Great King a little later, it is not entirely clear whether he was acting on Persian orders or in accordance with his own interests.

In the course of further clashes, Dionysius II of Syracuse withdrew his aid from the Spartans, leading them to turn to the Persians for assistance once more. Thus, in 367/6 BC, Greek envoys to the court of the Great king engaged in what the ancient historian Karl Julius Beloch referred to as the Wettkriechen (wager-creep), in which the Theban Pelopidas was ultimately successful. The Persians now recognised Thebes as the organising power in Greece in the same way that they had recognised Sparta in the King's Peace twenty years earlier. Henceforth, the Messenians were to be independent from Sparta and Amphipolis from Athens, while the Eleans were granted the neighbouring area of Triphylia. Furthermore, all armies and the fleet of the Athenians were to be reduced in size.

This attempt at a Common Peace was rejected by Sparta and Athens. The Thebans did not manage to enthuse other city-states with the agreement either. These two attempts at a Common Peace under Theban hegemony represent a return to the idea of peace presented in 387 BC: the Persians attempted to use the influence of a Greek hegemonic power to enforce their interests. That both attempts, unlike the King's Peace, were rejected is a result of the fact that the Great King had lost power as a peace-broker, as a result of the revolt of Ariobarzanes and other satraps. The most important reason for the course of events, however, may have been the experiences of the Greek cities with Persia after the King's Peace.

=== The Common Peace of 362 ===
Due to the growing Theban pressure on Athens (such as the seizure of Oropus in 366 BC), the Athenians became hostile once more, especially when actual help from their allies failed to materialise. None of the Greek states were able to gain full dominance in the following years. The conflict arising from the split in the Arcadian League also remained unresolved. This culminated in 362 BC with the Battle of Mantinea, in which the Spartans, Athenians and their allies faced down the Thebans and their allies. After the battle, in which the foremost Theban commander Epaminondas was killed, both sides considered themselves the victors and again concluded a Common Peace.

For the first time, the agreement was reached neither at the instigation of one of the leading powers, nor as a result of the power of the Persian king. In this and in the refusal of the Greek states to support the Great Satraps' Revolt against Persia, many scholars have seen a positive element. According to this viewpoint, the Greeks had managed to control themselves and establish a peace on their own. The opposing view is that the basis of this new Common Peace was simply the military and economic exhaustion of all parties, which also made an intervention in Asia Minor completely unthinkable.

The terms of the agreement particularly indicate that they arose from widespread war weariness and a desire to make peace as quickly as possible. They allowed each state to hold whatever they actually possessed at the time when the treaty was concluded. Territorial conflicts were not resolved at all – they no longer even posed an obstacle to agreement. The Arcadian League remained split into a northern and a southern half and the Messenians continued to be independent. Since Messenia made up the western half of their state prior to the defeat at Leuctra, the Spartans did not accede to this Common Peace, but they were in no condition to carry on the war.

=== The Common Peace as the basis of the League of Corinth ===
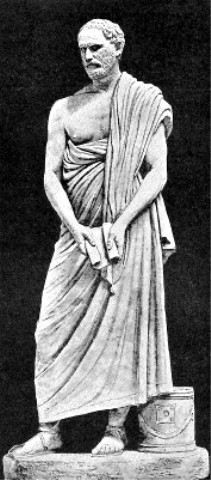
Demosthenes

After Mantinea, Greek politics continued along the same lines as before. When conflict with the rising power of Philip II of Macedon became more intense in the 350s BC, the idea of the Common Peace was revived once more. Philip first made the suggestion of replacing the Peace of Philocrates which had ended the Third Sacred War with a Common Peace. Demosthenes and other advocates of a decidedly anti-Macedonian approach had gained preeminence in Athens. They rejected the proposal and called for war against Philip of Macedon. In 340/39 BC, the Athenians successfully brought together an alliance of Greek states, but their forces were decisively defeated by Philip at the Battle of Chaeronea in 338 BC.

The Macedonians reacted harshly only against the Thebans, wishing instead to take advantage of the power of Athens and the other states by means of a league. The treaty establishing this league contained an express ban on interfering in the constitutions of other states by force (essentially an autonomy clause) and general bans on conflict and piracy for the first time, as well as a guarantee of free navigation. Only the Spartans refused to join this league. The other states were to send representatives, who would meet in a synedrion (council). They then entered into a personal alliance with Philip II, making him the Hegemon of the League.

Theoretically, the freedom and autonomy of the Greek state were thus assured. In practice, however, the general ban on conflict marked a striking limitation on independence. In addition, the Macedonians retained garrisons in the Cadmea of Thebes, the Acrocorinth, and at Chalcis – ostensibly to maintain the Common Peace.

The League of Corinth therefore marked the end of the Common Peace as the foundation for full equality between states and linked the idea of peace strongly with the guarantee of a hegemonic power once more. The alliance and the Common Peace were interlinked in the league treaty. The pan-Hellenic idea of a unified Greece and a campaign of vengeance against Persia were enabled by this Common Peace.

== Reasons for failure ==
With autonomy and freedom, the Greek states at the beginning of the fourth century BC found a formula for an inclusive peace system which was acceptable to all sides. After 387 BC no peace was possible without it, even if the individual attempts only held for a few years each. However, the principles of the Common Peace also found their way into league treaties, such as the Second Athenian Confederacy and the League of Corinth. A major opportunity for the development of a true Common Peace lay in the fact that the peace idea proved flexible enough to be developed further in this way.

Scholars like Bengtson take the view that the Greek city-states did not have enough time before the establishment of the Macedonian hegemony to fully adopt the Common Peace as an instrument of peace and as the foundations of a new order in the Greek world. The best chance for an enduring peace on the basis of equality between city-states was probably missed with the failure of the Common Peace of 371 BC. Nine years later, after the Battle of Mantinea, a Common Peace was seen only as a compromise solution. The revival of the concept by Philip of Macedon was undertaken only in the interests of Macedonian power, as it had previously been used to support the interests of Persia, Sparta, Athens, and Thebes.

A major aspect of the failure of the Common Peace lay in the formulation of the concept itself, especially the broad interpretation of the autonomy clause. The mutual control of Greek states by one another was only possible at the beginning of the fourth century BC. The idea that any limitations of the ability to wage war were restrictions on freedom and autonomy made any system of peace almost certain to fail.

The leaders of the city-states were aware that goodwill alone was not enough to guarantee a Common Peace. Depending on the political situation, they developed mechanisms of enforcement to prevent disturbances of the peace. They gradually came to the conclusion that a Common Peace on the basis of equal rights for all states was only possible if all participants were to immediately come to the aid of any member of the alliance under attack. This assumed a roughly equal balance of power between the Greek states, which actually only existed for a short period between 375 BC and 371 BC. Before and after these dates, a Common Peace would only have had a chance if a strong guaranteeing power was prepared to provide military support to the agreement as necessary.

== Afterlife ==
The principles of the Common Peace developed by the Greeks in the fourth century BC only developed once more in Europe in the 17th century AD, when they became the basis for enduring peace agreements and systems. Thus, the Peace of Westphalia was the first European peace agreement in modern times to be based on principles of the equality of sovereign states and on the inviolability of their internal affairs – that is, on the idea of autonomy. In his work Perpetual Peace of 1795, Immanuel Kant went one step further. He advocated not only the principle of non-intervention, but also called for a Völkerbund (people's league). In order to end the lawless natural situation between states, this would establish a federal relationship between them, in a manner similar to the Common Peace proposed after the Battle of Leuctra. Kant's ideas were appealed to in the twentieth century by the founders of the League of Nations and the United Nations.

== See also ==
- Spartan hegemony
- Theban hegemony

== Bibliography ==
- Ernst Baltrusch. Symmachie und Spondai. Untersuchungen zum griechischen Völkerrecht der archaischen und klassischen Zeit (8.-5. Jahrhundert v. Chr.) Untersuchungen zur antiken Literatur und Geschichte, vol. 43, edited by Winfried Bühler et al., Walter de Gruyter, New York, Berlin 1994.
- Hermann Bengtson. Griechische Geschichte. Von den Anfängen bis zur römischen Kaiserzeit. Handbuch der Altertumswissenschaft. Vol. 3, 4. Munich1977, 1996. ISBN 3-406-06660-7.
- Hermann Bengtson (ed.). Die Staatsverträge des Altertums. Bd. 2. Die Verträge der griechisch-römischen Welt von 700 bis 338 v. Chr. Munich/Berlin 1962
- G. L. Cawkwell. "The Common Peace of 366/5 B.C." The Classical Quarterly N.S. 11.1. (1961) pp. 80–86. ISSN 1471-6844
- Max Dieckhoff. "Zwei Friedensreden." Kleinere Attische Redner. edited by Anargyros Anastassiou and Dieter Irmer. Wissenschaftliche Buchgesellschaft, Darmstadt 1977, pp. 379–391. ISBN 3-534-03843-6.
- Victor Ehrenberg. Der Staat der Griechen, 2nd edition, Artemis, Zürich 1965.
- John V.A. Fine. The Ancient Greeks: A critical history (Harvard University Press, 1983) ISBN 0-674-03314-0
- Franz Hampl. Die griechischen Staatsverträge des 4. Jahrhunderts vor Christi Geburt. Preisschriften der Fürstlich Jablonowskischen Gesellschaft zu Leipzig. Vol. 54. Leipzig 1938, Rome 1966 (Repr.).
- Martin Jehne. Koine Eirene. Untersuchungen zu den Befriedungs- und Stabilisierungsbemühungen in der griechische Poliswelt des 4. Jahrhunderts v. Chr. Hermes Einzelschrift. Vol. 63. Stuttgart 1994. ISBN 3-515-06199-1.
- Immanuel Kant. Zum Ewigen Frieden. Ein philosophischer Entwurf, edited by Theodor Valentiner, Philipp Reclam Jun., Stuttgart 1983.
- J.A.O Larsen. Greek Federal States: Their Institutions and History. Oxford University Press, London 1968. ISBN 019814265X.
- J.A.O Larsen. "Rezension von T. T. B. Ryder, Koine Eirene." Gnomon 38 (1966) pp. 256–260. ISSN 0017-1417
- Thomas Pistorius. Hegemoniestreben und Autonomiesicherung in der griechischen Vertragspolitik klassischer und hellenistischer Zeit. Europäische Hochschulschriften. Series 3. Geschichte und ihre Hilfswissenschaften. Vol. 272. Frankfurt am Main 1985. ISBN 3-8204-8494-9.
- Timothy T. B. Ryder. Koine Eirene. General Peace and Local Independence in Ancient Greece. Oxford University Press, London 1965.
- Christian Schmidt. Der Dreißigjährige Krieg, C. H. Beck Verlag, München 1995.
- Fritz Taeger. Der Friede von 362/1. Ein Beitrag zur Geschichte der panhellenischen Bewegung im 4. Jahrhundert. Tübinger Beiträge zur Altertumswissenschaft, Vol. 11. Stuttgart 1930.
