= 392 BC =

392 BC in various calendars
Gregorian calendar	392 BC; CCCXCII BC
Ab urbe condita	362
Ancient Egypt era	XXIX dynasty, 7
Pharaoh	Hakor, 2
Ancient Greek Olympiad (summer)	97th Olympiad (victor)¹
Assyrian calendar	4359
Balinese saka calendar	N/A
Bengali calendar	−985 – −984
Berber calendar	559
Buddhist calendar	153
Burmese calendar	−1029
Byzantine calendar	5117–5118
Chinese calendar	戊子年 (Earth Rat); 2306 or 2099 — to — 己丑年 (Earth Ox); 2307 or 2100
Coptic calendar	−675 – −674
Discordian calendar	775
Ethiopian calendar	−399 – −398
Hebrew calendar	3369–3370
- Hindu calendars
Vikram Samvat	−335 – −334
Shaka Samvat	N/A
Kali Yuga	2709–2710
Holocene calendar	9609
Iranian calendar	1013 BP – 1012 BP
Islamic calendar	1044 BH – 1043 BH
Javanese calendar	N/A
Julian calendar	N/A
Korean calendar	1942
Minguo calendar	2303 before ROC 民前2303年
Nanakshahi calendar	−1859
Thai solar calendar	151–152
Tibetan calendar	ས་ཕོ་བྱི་བ་ལོ་ (male Earth-Rat) −265 or −646 or −1418 — to — ས་མོ་གླང་ལོ་ (female Earth-Ox) −264 or −645 or −1417

Year 392 BC was a year of the pre-Julian Roman calendar. At the time, it was known as the Year of the Consulship of Poplicola and Capitolinus (or, less frequently, year 362 Ab urbe condita). The denomination 392 BC for this year has been used since the early medieval period, when the Anno Domini calendar era became the prevalent method in Europe for naming years.

== Events ==
=== By place ===
==== Persian Empire ====
- The Persian general, Struthas is dispatched by King Artaxerxes II to take command of the satrapy of Sardis, replacing Tiribazus, and to pursue an anti-Spartan policy.

==== Greece ====
- During the Corinthian War, the Spartans dispatch an ambassador, Antalcidas, to the Persian satrap Tiribazus, hoping to turn the Persians against the allies by informing them of Conon's use of the Persian fleet to begin rebuilding the Athenian empire. Learning of this, the Athenians send an embassy led by Conon to present their case to the Persians at Sardis. Alarmed by Conon's actions, Tiribazus arrests him, and secretly provides the Spartans with money to equip a fleet. Although Conon quickly escapes, he dies in Cyprus without returning to Athens.
- A peace conference between the Greek city-states is held in Sparta. Andocides, Athenian orator and politician, goes with three colleagues to negotiate peace with Sparta. The conference is unsuccessful and Athens rejects the terms and exiles the ambassadors.

==== Sicily ====
- Dionysius I of Syracuse, having increased his power over the native Sicilians (Sicels), is now attacked by a second Carthaginian expedition. He is forced to ally himself with the Sicels. The Carthaginian army, under Mago II, is defeated, makes peace, and returns to Carthage. The treaty with Carthage is advantageous to Dionysius.

=== By topic ===
==== Art ====
- Isocrates sets up a school of rhetoric in Chios.

== Deaths ==
- Conon, Athenian general (approximate date)
