= 395 BC =

395 BC in various calendars
- Gregorian calendar: 395 BC; CCCXCV BC
- Ab urbe condita: 359
- Ancient Egypt era: XXIX dynasty, 4
- Pharaoh: Nepherites I, 4
- Ancient Greek Olympiad (summer): 96th Olympiad, year 2
- Assyrian calendar: 4356
- Balinese saka calendar: N/A
- Bengali calendar: −988 – −987
- Berber calendar: 556
- Buddhist calendar: 150
- Burmese calendar: −1032
- Byzantine calendar: 5114–5115
- Chinese calendar: 乙酉年 (Wood Rooster); 2303 or 2096 — to — 丙戌年 (Fire Dog); 2304 or 2097
- Coptic calendar: −678 – −677
- Discordian calendar: 772
- Ethiopian calendar: −402 – −401
- Hebrew calendar: 3366–3367
- Hindu calendars
- Vikram Samvat: −338 – −337
- Shaka Samvat: N/A
- Kali Yuga: 2706–2707
- Holocene calendar: 9606
- Iranian calendar: 1016 BP – 1015 BP
- Islamic calendar: 1047 BH – 1046 BH
- Javanese calendar: N/A
- Julian calendar: N/A
- Korean calendar: 1939
- Minguo calendar: 2306 before ROC 民前2306年
- Nanakshahi calendar: −1862
- Thai solar calendar: 148–149
- Tibetan calendar: ཤིང་མོ་བྱ་ལོ་ (female Wood-Bird) −268 or −649 or −1421 — to — མེ་ཕོ་ཁྱི་ལོ་ (male Fire-Dog) −267 or −648 or −1420

Year 395 BC was a year of the pre-Julian Roman calendar. At the time, it was known as the Year of the Tribunate of Cossus, Medullinus, Scipio, Fidenas, Ambustus and Lactucinus (or, less frequently, year 359 Ab urbe condita). The denomination 395 BC for this year has been used since the early medieval period, when the Anno Domini calendar era became the prevalent method in Europe for naming years.

== Events ==
=== By place ===
==== Persian Empire ====
- The Persian satrap Tissaphernes' enemy Parysatis, mother of Cyrus, succeeds in persuading Persian King Artaxerxes II to have him executed at Colossae, Phrygia (now Turkey). Parysatis cannot forgive Tissaphernes for the rough treatment he has handed out to her favourite son, the late Cyrus.
- After spending the winter in organizing a cavalry force, Agesilaus II, the King of Sparta, makes a successful incursion into Lydia in the spring.
- Tithraustes replaces Tissaphernes. An armistice is concluded between Tithraustes and Agesilaus. Tithraustes bribes the Spartans to move north into the satrapy of Pharnabazus.
- Unable to defeat Agesilaus's army, Pharnabazus decides to force Agesilaus to withdraw by stirring up trouble on the Greek mainland. He dispatches Timocrates of Rhodes to visit Athens, Thebes, Corinth, and Argos to incite and bribe them to act against Sparta. Timocrates succeeds in persuading powerful factions in each of those states to pursue an anti-Spartan policy.

==== Greece ====
- The "Corinthian War" begins, with Athens, Thebes, Corinth and Argos (with the backing of Persia) against Sparta. The Spartans prepare to send out an army against this new alliance, and order Agesilaus to return to Greece. Agesilaus sets out for Sparta with his troops, crossing the Hellespont and marching west through Thrace.
- The Spartans arrange for two armies, one under the Spartan general Lysander and the other under the Spartan King Pausanias, to rendezvous at and attack the Boeotian city of Haliartus. Lysander, arriving before Pausanias, persuades the city of Orchomenus to revolt from the Boeotian confederacy, and then advances to Haliartus with his troops. There, he is killed after bringing his forces too near the walls of the city.
- The Battle of Haliartus between the Spartans and the Thebans ends inconclusively. Pausanias, arriving a day later, takes back the bodies of the Spartan dead under a truce, and returns to Sparta. There, he is put on trial for his life and flees to Tegea before he can be convicted. Pausanias is replaced as king of Sparta by his son Agesipolis I.

== Deaths ==
- Lysander, Spartan general and admiral
- Tissaphernes, Persian satrap
- Shishunaga, founder of the Shishunaga dynasty of South Asia
