= 391 BC =

391 BC in various calendars
- Gregorian calendar: 391 BC; CCCXCI BC
- Ab urbe condita: 363
- Ancient Egypt era: XXIX dynasty, 8
- Pharaoh: Hakor, 3
- Ancient Greek Olympiad (summer): 97th Olympiad, year 2
- Assyrian calendar: 4360
- Balinese saka calendar: N/A
- Bengali calendar: −984 – −983
- Berber calendar: 560
- Buddhist calendar: 154
- Burmese calendar: −1028
- Byzantine calendar: 5118–5119
- Chinese calendar: 己丑年 (Earth Ox); 2307 or 2100 — to — 庚寅年 (Metal Tiger); 2308 or 2101
- Coptic calendar: −674 – −673
- Discordian calendar: 776
- Ethiopian calendar: −398 – −397
- Hebrew calendar: 3370–3371
- Hindu calendars
- Vikram Samvat: −334 – −333
- Shaka Samvat: N/A
- Kali Yuga: 2710–2711
- Holocene calendar: 9610
- Iranian calendar: 1012 BP – 1011 BP
- Islamic calendar: 1043 BH – 1042 BH
- Javanese calendar: N/A
- Julian calendar: N/A
- Korean calendar: 1943
- Minguo calendar: 2302 before ROC 民前2302年
- Nanakshahi calendar: −1858
- Thai solar calendar: 152–153
- Tibetan calendar: ས་མོ་གླང་ལོ་ (female Earth-Ox) −264 or −645 or −1417 — to — ལྕགས་ཕོ་སྟག་ལོ་ (male Iron-Tiger) −263 or −644 or −1416

Year 391 BC was a year of the pre-Julian Roman calendar. At the time, it was known as the Year of the Tribunate of Flavus, Medullinus, Camerinus, Fusus, Mamercinus and Mamercinus (or, less frequently, year 363 Ab urbe condita). The denomination 391 BC for this year has been used since the early medieval period, when the Anno Domini calendar era became the prevalent method in Europe for naming years.

== Events ==
=== By place ===
==== Persian Empire ====
- The Persian satrap, Struthas, pursues an anti-Spartan policy, prompting the Spartans to order Thibron, their governor, to the Greek cities of Ionia to attack him. Thibron successfully ravages Persian territory for a time, but is killed, along with a number of his men, when Struthas ambushes them.
- Evagoras of Salamis and the Persians battle each other for control of Cyprus. Aided by the Athenians and the Egyptians, Evagoras extends his rule over the greater part of Cyprus and to several cities of Anatolia.

==== Greece ====
- The Athenian general, Iphicrates, with a force composed almost entirely of light troops and peltasts (javelin throwers), wins a decisive victory against the Spartan regiment that has been stationed at Lechaeum in the Battle of Lechaeum. This is the first time that a force of light infantry defeats a unit of Greek hoplites.
- Iphicrates also campaigns against Phlius and Arcadia, decisively defeating their armies and plundering the territory of the Arcadians when they refuse to engage his troops. After this victory, an Argive army marches to Corinth, and, seizing the Acrocorinth, effectively merges Argos and Corinth.

==== Sicily ====
- Dionysius I, tyrant of Syracuse, begins an attempt to extend his rule to the Greek cities of southern Italy. He unsuccessfully besieges Rhegium.

==== Roman Republic ====
- The Roman dictator Marcus Furius Camillus is accused of making an unfair distribution of the spoils of his victory at Veii. He goes into voluntary exile.
- Quintus Fabius Ambustus and two other Fabii are sent as ambassadors by Rome to a wandering tribe of Celts (whom the Romans call Gauls), under Brennus, who are advancing down the Tiber while the Celtic army is besieging Clusium. After Quintus Fabius' group becomes involved in a skirmish with the Gauls and kill one of the Gauls' leaders, the offended Gauls demand that Rome surrender the Fabii members to them. The Romans refuse, so the Gauls advance on Rome.

== Deaths ==
- Thibron, Spartan general
- Mozi, Chinese philosopher (approximate date) (b. c. 470 BC)
