= 391st =

391st may refer to:

- 391st Bombardment Group, non-flying unit of the Pennsylvania Air National Guard, stationed at Horsham Air National Guard Station
- 391st Bombardment Squadron, part of the 6th Air Mobility Wing at MacDill Air Force Base, Florida
- 391st Fighter Squadron (391 FS), part of the 366th Fighter Wing at Mountain Home Air Force Base, Idaho

== See also ==
- 391 (number)
- 391, the year 391 (CCCXCI) of the Julian calendar
- 391 BC
