= 392d =

392nd or 392d may refer to:

- 392d Bombardment Group, provisional United States Air Force unit assigned to Air Combat Command to activate or inactivate as needed
- 392d Bombardment Squadron or 92d Air Refueling Squadron, squadron of the 92d Air Refueling Wing's 92d Operations Group
- 392d Fighter Squadron or 178th Reconnaissance Squadron, unit of the North Dakota Air National Guard 119th Wing
- 392d Training Squadron (392 TRS), intercontinental ballistic missile (ICBM) training unit at Vandenberg AFB, California
- 392nd (Croatian) Infantry Division (Wehrmacht), a so-called "legionnaire" division of the German Army during World War II
- MS Peniarth 392D (Hengwrt Chaucer manuscript), an early-15th-century manuscript of the Canterbury Tales, held in the National Library of Wales in Aberystwyth

== See also ==
- 392 (number)
- 392, the year 392 (CCCXCII) of the Julian calendar
- 392 BC
