= 395th Division =

395th Division may refer to:

- 395th Infantry Division, Wehrmacht, Germany
- 395th Rifle Division, Soviet Union

== See also ==
- List of military divisions by number
- 395th (disambiguation)
