= Ecdicus (Lacedaemonian) =

Spartan admiral during the Corinthian War

Ecdicus (Ancient Greek: Ἔκδικος), Diodorus Siculus called him Eudocimus (Εὐδόκιμος), was a Lacedaemonian general. During the Corinthian War, he was sent with eight ships to Rhodes in order to assist oligarchs exiled from the island against the democratic party at 391 BC.

When he arrived at Cnidus, he found out that his enemies had much more forces than him and so he waited. The Spartans then dispatched a bigger fleet to assist him under the command of Teleutias.
