= Diphridas =

Military officer from Sparta

Diphridas was a Spartan general in the Corinthian War. In 391 BC, he was placed in command of Spartan forces in Asia Minor, whose previous commander, Thibron, had been killed in an ambush. Diphridas continued his predecessor's policy of launching plundering raids into the territory of Persian satrap in the region, Struthas. These raids were highly successful; Diphridas at one point captured Struthas's son-in-law, and with the plunder he took he was able to hire mercenaries to enlarge his force.
