= Arsames (son of Artaxerxes II) =

4th-century BC Persian prince

Arsames (Greek: Ἀρσάμης) was one of over a hundred illegitimate sons fathered with concubines by 4th century BCE Achaemenid ruler and King of Kings, Artaxerxes II Mnemon. Despite his illegitimate legal status, Arsames was loved by Mnemon even more than some of his legitimate sons.

Mnemon had a legitimate son named Artaxerxes III Ochus who had two older brothers ahead of him in succession. After the eldest was executed for treason, Ochus successfully conspired to drive the next oldest to suicide, leaving him next in line for the throne.

However, Mnemon actively disliked Ochus, so he passed him over and made Arsames his heir.

Arsames was shortly thereafter killed by Arpates, son of the satrap Tiribazus (who had originally conspired with the eldest legitimate son, and had been killed for this), likely at the behest of Ochus, who was thereafter declared crown prince just before Mnemon's death.
