= 395th =

395th may refer to:

- 395th Bombardment Group, inactive United States Air Force unit
- 395th Fighter Squadron or 181st Airlift Squadron, unit of the 136th Airlift Wing of the Texas Air National Guard
- 395th Infantry Regiment (United States), unit of the United States 99th Infantry Division
- 395th Strategic Missile Squadron, inactive United States Air Force unit

== See also ==
- 395 (number)
- 395, the year 395 (CCCXCV) of the Julian calendar
- 395 BC
