= Teleutias =

Brother of the Spartan king Agesilaus II

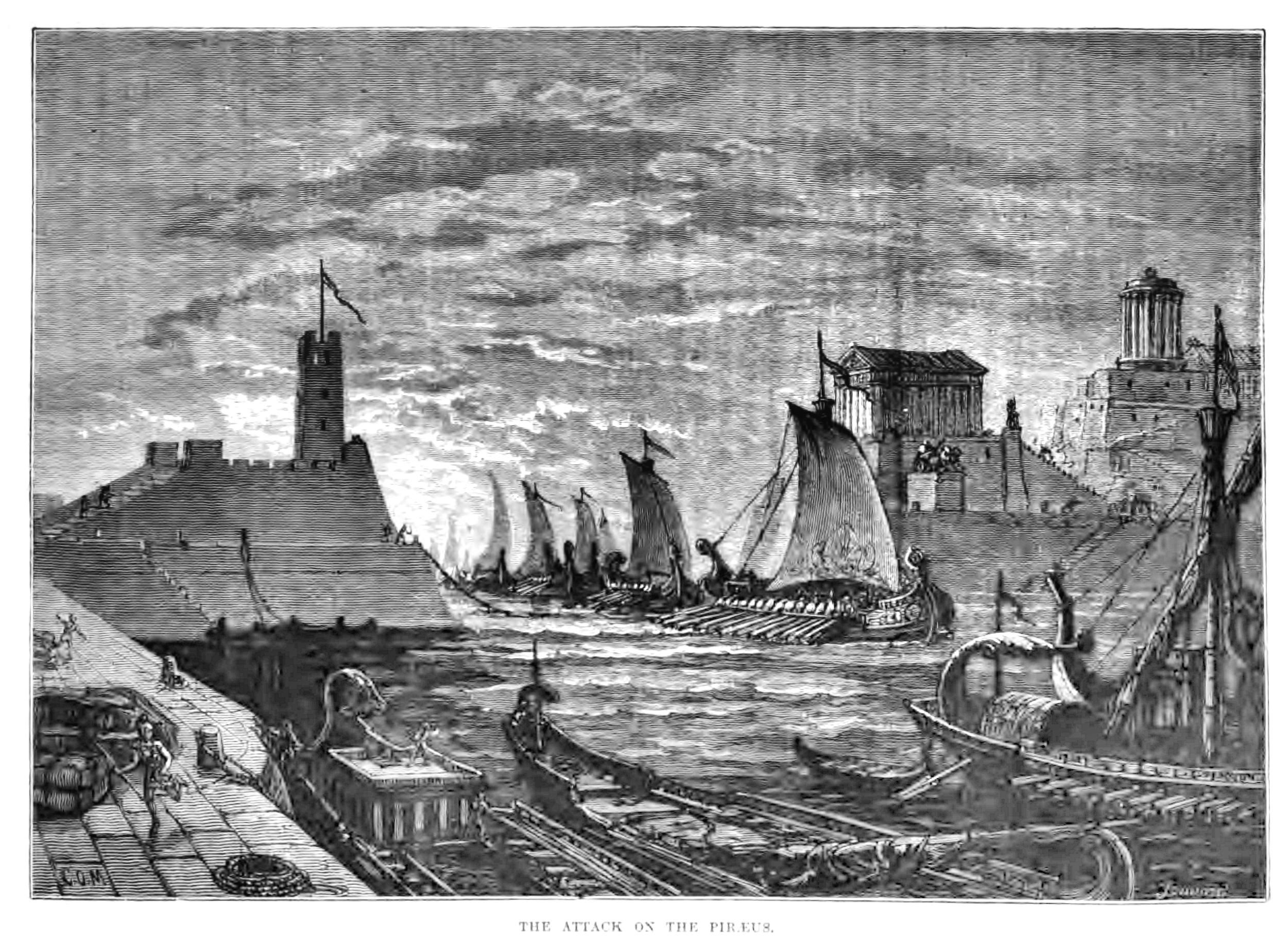
The Attack on the Piraeus by Teleutias circa 389 BC.

Teleutias (Greek: Τελευτίας) was the brother of the Spartan king Agesilaus II, and a Spartan naval commander in the Corinthian War. He first saw action in the campaign to regain control of the Corinthian Gulf after the Spartan naval disaster at Cnidus in 394 BC, and was later active in the Spartan campaign against Argos in 391 BC. (It appears likely that Teleutias was navarch in 392/1 BC.) Later that year, he was dispatched to the Aegean to take command of a Spartan fleet harassing Rhodes. Once in command, he attacked and seized a small Athenian fleet sailing to aid Evagoras I of Salamis, Cyprus, then settled in to attack Rhodes with his newly augmented fleet.

After being replaced in command of this fleet, Teleutias returned to Sparta to great acclaim, and was soon sent out again to take command of a fleet on the island of Aegina circa 389 BC. The Spartans had previously suffered several defeats in this theater, leaving the sailors greatly demoralized, and the Athenians had to some degree relaxed their vigilance in the area. Teleutias took advantage of this fact to launch a raid on Piraeus, the harbor of Athens, where he seized a number of merchant ships and fishing vessels. The raid resulted in a great deal of plunder for the Spartans, and the confidence the victory instilled in the sailors allowed Teleutias to operate more vigorously with his fleet.

Xenophon, reporting a speech given by Teleutias to his men on Aegina, records the following piece of rhetoric:

for indeed the sweetest thing of all surely is to flatter no man, Hellene or Barbarian, for the sake of hire; we will suffice to ourselves, and from a source to which honour pre-eminently invites us; since, I need not remind you, abundance won from the enemy in war furnishes forth not bodily nutrition only, but a feast of glory the wide world over.

George Cawkwell has argued that this speech constitutes a direct attack on the policy of accommodation with Persia that would presently produce the Peace of Antalcidas, and on these grounds identifies Teleutias, along with Agesilaus, as part of a pan-Hellenist bloc at Sparta opposed to the accommodationist bloc represented by Antalcidas.

In 382 BC, Teleutias commanded an expeditionary force of 10,000 men on a campaign against the Chalkidian League headed by the city of Olynthus in northeastern Greece. Moving slowly through Greece, Teleutias augmented his force with contingents from allied states, At the head of the substantial army which he had thus acquired, he entered Olynthian territory and won an initial victory outside the walls of Olynthus. The next spring, however, while leading a pillaging expedition into Olynthian territory, Teleutias ran into difficulty when a group of his peltasts rashly crossed over a river and were attacked by Olynthian cavalry. Teleutias drove off the cavalry by bringing up his hoplites and cavalry, but the Peloponnesians pursued too aggressively and came in under the walls of Olynthus, from where the enemy could fire down on them. A sudden attack by Olynthian infantry and cavalry routed Teleutias' force; he himself was killed, and his army suffered severe casualties.
