= Antalcidas =

Spartan general and statesman (died c. 367 BC)

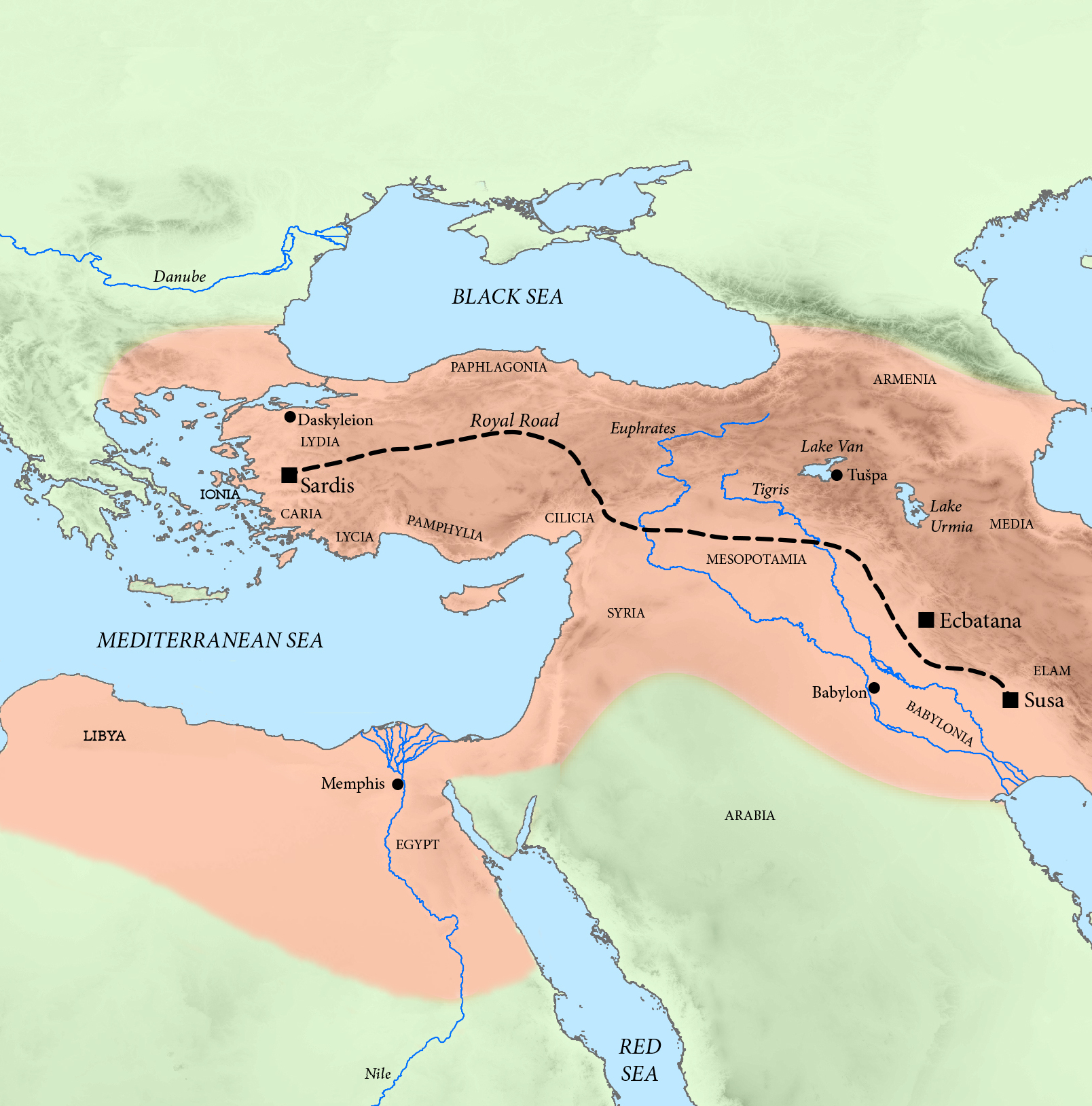
Antalcidas traveled to Susa to negotiate the peace at the Achaemenid court.

Antalcidas (Ancient Greek: Ἀνταλκίδας; died c. 367 BC), son of Leon, was an ancient Greek soldier, politician, and diplomat from Sparta.

== Life ==
Antalcidas came from a prominent family and was likely a relation by marriage to the Spartan king Agesilaus II.

Antalcidas is first recorded at the outset of the Corinthian War. Following the end of the Peloponnesian War after the destruction of the Athenian fleet at the Battle of Aegospotami in 405 BC, Sparta had launched a series of raids against the Persian satrapies of Asia Minor. Pharnabazus, satrap of Hellespontine Phrygia, finally responded by sending the Rhodian Timocrates to bribe the other Greek city states into declaring war on Sparta. Thebes rose up in 395 BC, eventually encouraging others to join in what became known as the Corinthian War. Persia was now on friendly terms with Athens and Pharnabazus permitted their disgraced general Conon to command his fleet of Phoenician and Cypriot ships in attacks that culminated in the destruction of the Spartan fleet at Cnidus. He was then permitted to return to Athens with part of the fleet and given funds to rebuild the city's Long Walls.

Soon afterwards, in 393 or 392 BC, Antalcidas was dispatched to Tiribazus, the satrap of Lydia, to sue for peace. Learning of his mission, Athens sent its own embassy under Conon. The Spartans offered full recognition of Persian supremacy over Asia Minor, and the satrap threw the Athenians in jail. When King Artaxerxes II learned that Antalcidas had further convinced Tiribazus to provide funds for rebuilding Sparta's demolished navy, he replaced the satrap with Struthas, who resumed raiding Sparta and her allies. However, the Spartan fleet thus funded regained control of the Gulf of Corinth by the end of the year.

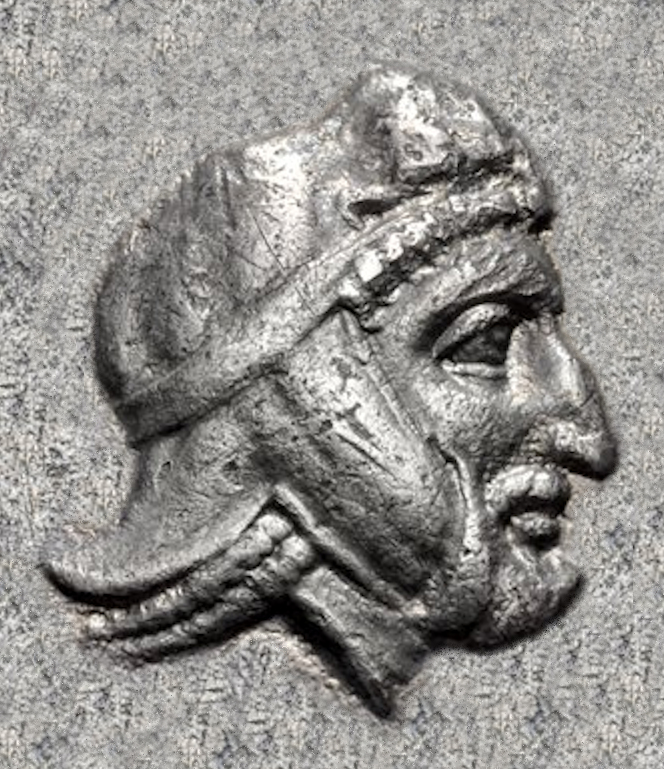
Satrap Tiribazos was the main negotiating counterpart to Antalcidas, on the Achaemenid side.

For unknown reasons, Tiribazus was restored to power in Lydia by 388 BC. Antalcidas resumed negotiations and over the next year the pair journeyed to Susa to win the king's support for a Persian alliance against Athens. This was granted and Antalcidas was made admiral of Sparta's fleets. He pursued a vigorous policy, particularly around the Hellespont, and the Athenians agreed to negotiate with Argos, Sparta, and the Persians at Tiribazus's seat at Sardis. By the winter of 387 BC, the Peace of Antalcidas had been arranged, by the terms of which:

1. all of Asia Minor, with the islands of Clazomenae and Cyprus, was recognized as subject to Persia, and
2. all other Greek cities—so far they were not already under Persian rule—were to be independent, except Lemnos, Imbros, and Scyros, which were returned to the Athenians.

The terms were ratified by the city governments over the next year. The reassertion of Spartan hegemony over Greece by abandoning the Greeks of Aeolia, Ionia, and Caria has been called the "most disgraceful event in Greek history".

Antalcidas continued in favor with Artaxerxes until the revolting Thebans annihilated Spartan supremacy at Leuctra in 371 BC, diminishing his influence. Plutarch notes a laconic comment made by Antalcidas to Agesilaus after one of the Spartan losses to Thebes, saying in effect, "Isn't it amazing how good they've gotten after all of the training we've given them." That year or possibly in 367 BC, Antalcidas undertook a final mission to Persia. Plutarch held that its failure drove him to starve himself to death.
