= Battle of Haliartus =

Battle of the Corinthian War, 395 BC

- Part of the Corinthian War
Date	395 BC
Location	Haliartus, Boeotia 38°22′45″N 23°05′16″E
Result	Athenian-Boeotian victory; Start of the Corinthian War

Belligerents
Sparta; Phocis	Athens; Boeotia

Commanders and leaders
Lysander †	Unknown
- Location of the Battle of Haliartus

The Battle of Haliartus was fought in 395 BC between Sparta and Athens. After the Athenian defeat at the Peloponnesian War, Athens tried to recover, but also gained the support of Boeotia. Dissatisfied with this situation, Sparta sent an army against Athens and was defeated by the Athenians and Boeotians. Lysander, one of Sparta's most successful generals, was killed in this battle. Haliartus marked the start of the Corinthian War, which continued until 387 BC.

== Prelude ==
In 396 or 395 BC, an ambassador from the Persian satrap Pharnabazus, Timocrates of Rhodes, arrived in Greece. There, he promised Persian funding and support to leading states of Greece if they would declare war on Sparta. Since Sparta's aggressive and unilateral actions had angered many of its allies, the prospect of Persian support was enough to induce a number of states, and in particular Thebes, to make war on Sparta.

Rather than undertake offensive operations immediately, the Thebans chose to precipitate a war indirectly. Accordingly, they persuaded the Locrians to raid Phocis, a Spartan ally. Thebes, as an ally of Locris, was obligated to assist in the conflict thus begun; Phocis, meanwhile, appealed to its ally, Sparta. The Spartans, seeing a chance to chasten the increasingly restive Thebans, chose to launch a major campaign against Thebes. Meanwhile, the Thebans sent emissaries to Athens requesting aid; a perpetual alliance was concluded between the Athenians and the Boeotians.

== Battle ==
The Spartan strategy for the campaign called for two armies, one under king Pausanias of the Agiad dynasty, composed of Spartan troops and Peloponnesian allies, and one under general Lysander composed of Phocians and other allies from northwest Greece, to meet at the town of Haliartus for a coordinated attack. Pausanias, however, delayed for several days in the Peloponnese, and Lysander arrived at Haliartus with his force while Pausanias was still several days away.

Unwilling to wait for Pausanias to arrive, Lysander marched his army up to the walls of Haliartus. When an attempt to take the city by subversion failed, he launched an assault on the walls. A sizable Theban force, however, was located nearby, perhaps unbeknownst to Lysander. This force hurried to the assistance of the city's defenders. In heated fighting under the walls of Haliartus, Lysander's force was routed and he himself was killed. The Thebans, however, pursued the defeated troops too far, and as they entered rough and steep terrain, the fleeing soldiers turned and drove the Thebans back with heavy losses. This reversal briefly disheartened the Thebans, but the following day Lysander's army disbanded, with each contingent returning to its home country.

== Aftermath ==
Several days after the battle, Pausanias reached Haliartus with his army. Wishing to recover the bodies of Lysander and the others killed in the battle, he asked for a truce, which the Thebans agreed to grant only on the condition that he depart from Boeotia. Pausanias agreed to this condition, collected the bodies of the dead, and returned to Sparta. Upon his return, Lysander's faction brought him to trial for arriving late and failing to attack when he did arrive, and Pausanias, recognizing that he would be convicted and executed, went into exile. Pausanias's exile, along with the death of Lysander, removed from the scene two of the three major actors on the Spartan political scene, leaving only Agesilaus, who would dictate Spartan policy for years to come.

The battle of Haliartus launched the Corinthian War, which stretched from 395 to 387 BC. Fighting resumed in the next year when Thebes and Athens, now supported by Corinth and Argos, fought against Spartan armies at Nemea and Coronea, and continued in the Aegean Sea and around the Isthmus of Corinth until the end of the war. This war produced little of lasting value for any state except Persia, which had instigated it; by raising trouble in Greece, the Persians were able to force Agesilaus to withdraw with his army from Ionia, and by the end of the war were in a position to dictate the terms of the peace.
