= Thibron (harmost) =

Spartan general (died 391 BC)

Thibron (Ancient Greek: Θίβρων; died 391 BC) was a Spartan general. He was sent out as harmost in 400 BC, with an army of about 5,000 men, composed of 1,000 Neodamodes (emancipated helots) and 4,000 other Peleponesians, to aid the Ionians against Tissaphernes, who wished to bring them into subjection. In addition to this force, Thibron recruited 2,000 local troops upon his arrival, but was initially unable to face the Persian army in the field. However, after he was joined by elements of the Ten Thousand, he was able to seize several cities. He then, according to Xenophon, settled in to besiege Larissa, but this proved fruitless, and Thibron was ordered to abandon it. Diodorus suggests that at some point, after taking Magnesia, Thibron attempted to conquer Tralles in Ionia, but was unsuccessful and returned to Magnesia. He is then said to have withdrawn to Ephesus after Tissaphernes arrived with a large force of cavalry. In any case, Thibron was recalled to Sparta and replaced by another general, Dercylidas, before he could launch his next campaign. Upon his return to Sparta Thibron was tried and exiled for allowing his troops to plunder Sparta's allies in the region.

In 391 BC, during the Corinthian War, Thibron was again dispatched to Ionia with orders to take aggressive action against the Persian satrap Struthas, who was pursuing a pro-Athenian, anti-Spartan policy. He was given an army of 8,000 men and launched a number of successful raids into Persian territory. His raids tended to be poorly organized, however, and Struthas took advantage of this to ambush one of these expeditions. Struthas successfully lured Thibron and his men into ideal cavalry terrain before launching the attack. The Spartan army was routed and most of them, including Thibron, were killed. One source even indicates that Thibron was slain in personal combat by Struthas himself. What was left of his army was subsequently incorporated into a new army under Diphridas. It is likely that this Thibron is the same one mentioned by Aristotle as writing a treatise on the Spartan Constitution.
