= Tiribazus =

Achaemenid satrap (c. 440 BC-370 BC)

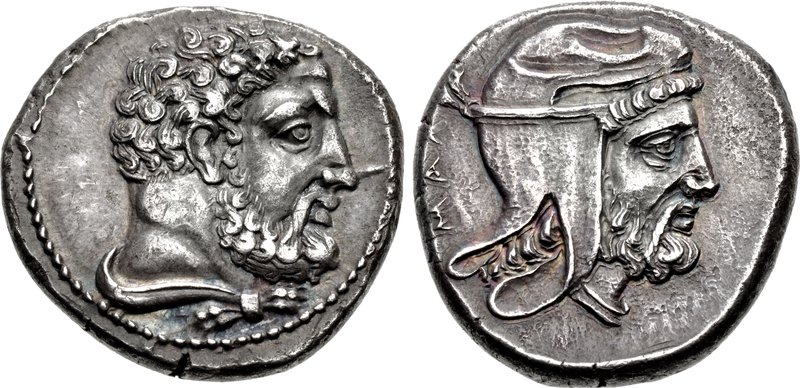
- Coin minted by Tiribazus at Mallus in Cilicia. The reverse portrays him wearing a Persian satrapal headdress, while the obverse portrays Herakles

Satrap of Lydia
- Preceded by: Tissaphernes
- Succeeded by: Autophradates

Personal details
- Born: c. 440 BC
- Died: c. 370 BC (aged 70)

Military service
- Allegiance: Achaemenid Empire
- Rank: Satrap
- Battles/wars: Corinthian War

Tiribazus, Tiribazos or Teribazus (Old Iranian: Tīrībāzu; Ancient Greek: Τιρίβαζος) (c. 440 BC–370 BC) was an Achaemenid satrap of Armenia and later satrap of Lydia in western Anatolia.

== Satrap of Western Armenia ==
He was highly regarded by the Persian King Artaxerxes II, and when he was present, so Xenophon tells us, no one else had the honour of helping the sovereign to mount his horse.

Until 395 BC, Tiribazus served as the hyparch of Western Armenia.

== Satrap of Lydia ==
He succeeded Tithraustes as satrap of Western Asia (Sardis). He was holding this office when, in 393 BC, Antalcidas was sent to negotiate, through him, a peace for Sparta with the Persian king.

In 392 BC, while the Corinthian War was being contested amongst the Greek states, Tiribazus received envoys from the major belligerents of that war, and held a conference in which a proposal for ending the war was discussed. That discussion failed, but Tiribazus, convinced that Athens was becoming a threat to Persia in the Aegean, secretly provided funds to rebuild the Spartan fleet. When the Persian king Artaxerxes II learned of this, Tiribazus was removed from power and replaced by Struthas, who pursued an anti-Spartan policy.

However, five years later, in 387 BC, Tiribazus was again in power, and worked together with the Spartan general Antalcidas to rebuild the Spartan fleet as a threat to Athenian interests in the region. This action brought the Athenians and their allies to the negotiating table. Tiribazus represented Artaxerxes at the ensuing negotiations, which led to the Peace of Antalcidas.

In 386/385 BC, Tiribazus was made joint commander of the Persian expedition against Evagoras I (r. 411–374 BC), the king of Salamis in Cyprus. He was assigned to the lead the Persian navy, while Orontes I, the satrap of Armenia, led the land forces. Tiribazus reportedly knew Orontes from his early days in Armenia, where he had served as the hyparch of its western part till 395 BC. By 382 BC, preparations for the campaign had been made, with a battle taking place the following year near the Cyprian city of Kition, where the Persians emerged victorious due to their larger fleet. Evagoras withdrew to Salamis, which he started fortifying.

Failing to gain help from the Egyptian pharaoh Hakor (r. 392/1–379/8 BC), Evagoras started to negotiate a peace treaty with Tiribazus, offering to withdraw from all the cities of Cyprus except Salamis, and pay a fixed yearly tribute to the Persian crown. Tiribazus was inclined to accept the offer, but the negotiations failed after Evagoras refused to also cede his status as king. The negotiations between Evagoras and Tiribazus led to Orontes to send a number of accusations to Artaxerxes II, which mentioned that Tiribazus was deliberately prolonging the war and planning to declare independence. Artaxerxes II was unable to make a proper assessment due to his distance, but could not risk Tiribazus ruin the recent Persian accomplishments, and as a result had him jailed in Susa, heavily weakening the position of the Persian expedition.

Glos, who was the father-in-law of Tiribazus, fearing for his own position, started plotting against Artaxerxes II and secretly making peace with Egypt and Sparta. Evagoras started to help from the Spartans and gave Glos information that would jeopardize Orontes' position. Under the threat of blackmail, Orontes was forced to make peace with Evagoras in 380 BC. The terms of the treaty was that Evagoras was obligated to pay tribute to the Persian king, but as a subordinate king rather than a slave. Artaxerxes II did not deem the conclusion of the war satisfactory, as it had cost 15,000 talents, and a result Orontes fell into disfavour. Meanwhile, Tiribazus was pardoned and restored to his former position.

Tiribazus now stood higher than ever in the royal favour, and received a promise of the hand of Amestris, the king's daughter. Artaxerxes, however, reneged on this arrangement, and married Amestris himself.

When King Artaxerxes reneged on a pledge to Tiribazus once more, this time with respect to Atossa, the youngest of the king's princesses, Tiribazus could no longer remain loyal to the king and incited Darius, the son of Artaxerxes, to join him in a plot against the king's life.

Tiribazus' plans were betrayed to Artaxerxes by a eunuch, and the conspirators were found out. Tiribazus offered a desperate resistance to the guards who endeavored to arrest him, and was slain with a javelin.

Tiribazus had a son, Arpates, who later killed Artaxerxes's favored son, Arsames.

== Sources ==
- Briant, Pierre (2002). From Cyrus to Alexander: A History of the Persian Empire. Eisenbrauns. ISBN 978-1575060316.
- Clark, Jessica H.; Turner, Brian (2018). Brill's Companion to Military Defeat in Ancient Mediterranean Society. Brill. ISBN 978-9004298583.
- Dandamaev, Muhammad A. (1989). A Political History of the Achaemenid Empire. Brill. ISBN 978-9004091726.
- Osborne, Michael J. (1973). "Orontes". Historia: Zeitschrift für Alte Geschichte. 22 (4): 515–551. ISSN 0018-2311. JSTOR 4435366.
- Ruzicka, Stephen (2012). Trouble in the West: Egypt and the Persian Empire, 525–332 BC. Oxford University Press. pp. 1–311. ISBN 9780199766628.
- Schmitt, Rüdiger (2002). "Orontes". In Yarshater, Ehsan (ed.). Encyclopædia Iranica (Online ed.). Encyclopædia Iranica Foundation.
- Troxell, Hyla A. (1981). "Orontes, Satrap of Mysia". Schweizerische Numismatische Rundschau. 60: 27–41. ISSN 0035-4163.
- Shannahan, John (2018). "The Baal/Figure in the Winged Disc Staters of Tiribazus". The Numismatic Chronicle. 178: 15–32. JSTOR 45176674.
