= Timocrates of Rhodes =

4th-century BC Rhodian Greek opposed to Sparta

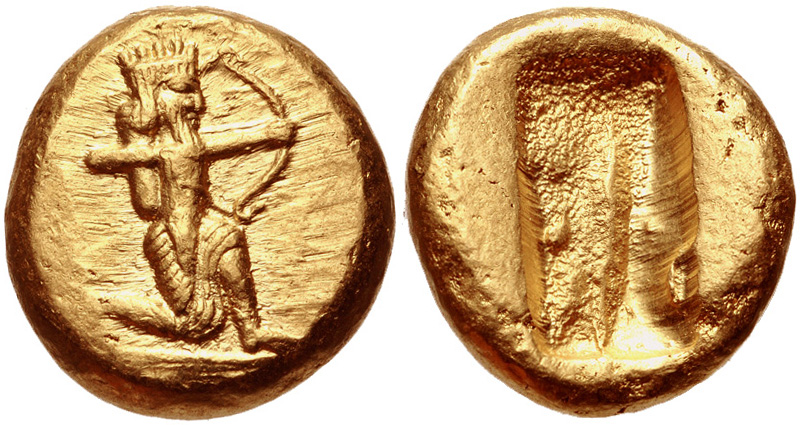
Timocrates of Rhodes delivered tens of thousands of Darics (popularly called "archers"), the main currency in Achaemenid coinage, that were used to bribe the Greek states to start a war against Sparta, so that Agesilaus would have to be recalled from Asia Minor.

Timocrates of Rhodes (Ancient Greek: Τιμοκράτης ὁ Ῥόδιος) was a Rhodian Greek sent by the Persian satrap Pharnabazus in 396 or 395 BC to distribute money to Greek city states and foment opposition to Sparta. He visited Athens, Thebes, Corinth, and Argos. His encouragement prompted Thebes to provoke Sparta into war, beginning the Corinthian War, which dragged on from 395 to 387 BC.

The primary aim of Timocrates' mission, which he accomplished, was to force the withdrawal of the Spartan king Agesilaus and his army from Ionia. Timocrates's success in this mission was the basis for the famous statement, recorded by Plutarch, that "a thousand Persian archers had driven [Agesilaus] out of Asia," referring to the archer that was stamped on Persian gold coins.
