= Struthas =

Early 4th-century BC Achaemenid satrap

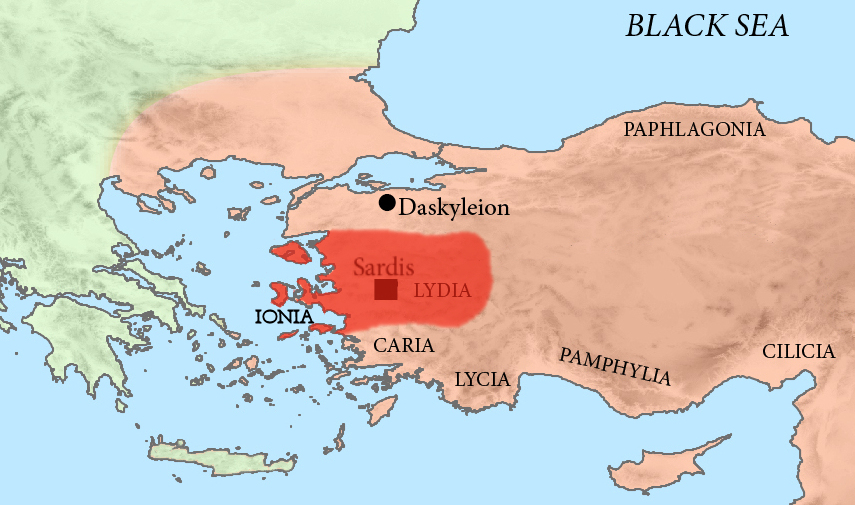
Struthas was satrap of Lydia, including Ionia.

Struthas was a Persian satrap for a brief period during the Corinthian War. In 392 BC, he was dispatched by Artaxerxes II to take command of the satrapy of Sardis, replacing Tiribazus, and to pursue an anti-Spartan policy. Accordingly, Struthas raided territory held by the Spartans and their allies, prompting the Spartans to order their commander in the region, Thibron, to begin aggressive activity against Struthas. Thibron raided successfully for a time, but Struthas eventually succeeded in ambushing one of his raiding expeditions. One source even indicates that Thibron was slain in personal combat by Struthas himself. What was left of his army was subsequently incorporated into a new army under Diphridas[2] before his cavalry routed and destroyed the rest of the Spartan army save for a few survivors that escaped to nearby cities and more that were left back at the camp due to not learning of the expedition in time to partake.

Thibron was then replaced by Diphridas, who rebuilt his army from the remnants of Thibron's and raided Struthas's territory successfully, even capturing his son-in-law, but achieved little remarkable success. Although the specific events of Struthas's removal from office are not known, by the early 380s BC he had been replaced by Tiribazus, and makes no further appearances in the historical record.

== Historical sources ==
- Xenophon, Hellenika 4, 8, 17-19 (online copies: Wikisource, Gutenberg)
- Diodor 14, 99, 1-3 (online copies: Loeb (LacusCurtius))
