= Charles Vince =

Charles Vince may refer to:

- Charles Vince (journalist) (1887–?), English journalist and author
- Charles Vince (Baptist) (1823–1874), English Baptist minister
- Charles Anthony Vince (1855–1929), English academic, school head and author
