= Mithridates of Cius =

Son of Ariobarzanes, prince of Cius

Mithridates (in Greek Mιθριδάτης; lived 4th century BCE), son of Ariobarzanes prince of Cius, is mentioned by Xenophon as having betrayed his father, and the same circumstance is alluded to by Aristotle.

He may or may not be the same Mithradates who accompanied the younger Cyrus, or the same Mithradates mentioned by Xenophon as satrap of Cappadocia and Lycaonia in the late 5th century BCE.

During the Satraps' Revolt in the 360s BCE, Mithridates tricked Datames to believe in him, but in the end arranged Datames' murder in 362 BCE. Similarly, Mithridates gave his own father Ariobarzanes of Phrygia to the hands of the Persian overlord, so Ariobarzanes was crucified in 362 BCE.

Demosthenes speaks of Ariobarzanes and his three sons having been lately made Athenian citizens. - as signal of sympathy in the revolt effort, Athens made Ariobarzanes and three of his sons citizens of Athens. Mithradates was possibly one of those sons.

In 363 BCE already, Ariobarzanes II (possibly Mithridates' son) made himself master of the family fiefdom of Cius in Mysia. This Mithradates may therefore have died in 363 BCE, but the date is not recorded and only comes from later reconstructions of the succession in the dynasty.

Otherwise, this Mithradates may well be the same man as the elderly Mithridates II of Cius who held Cius in Mysia between 337 and 302 BCE, being said to be an old man at that time.
