= Ariobarzanes =

Ariobarzanes (Ancient Greek: Ἀριοβαρζάνης Ariobarzánēs, from Old Persian: *Aryābr̥zaⁿs, literally 'exalting the Aryans'; in Elamite: Har-ri-pir-tan; in Parthian: 𐭀𐭓𐭉𐭁𐭓𐭆𐭍 Arya-barzā̆n) is a male given name.

== Persian satraps ==
- Ariobarzanes of Phrygia (fl. 407 BC – 362 BC), Persian satrap of Phrygia who led an unsuccessful revolt against the King Artaxerxes II
- Ariobarzanes, Satrap of Persis (fl. 368 BC – 330 BC), Persian satrap of Persis who fought against Alexander the Great at the Battle of the Persian Gate as Alexander's forces were making their way to Persepolis in 330 BC

== Kings or satraps of the Mithridatic dynasty that ruled Pontus ==
- Ariobarzanes of Phrygia, the first known member of the family
- Ariobarzanes II of Cius (died 337 BC)
- Ariobarzanes of Pontus (died 250 BC), son of Mithridates I Ctistes and second king of Pontus

== Kings of Cappadocia ==
- Ariobarzanes I of Cappadocia, king of Cappadocia from 93 BC to ca. 63 or 62 BC
- Ariobarzanes II of Cappadocia, son and successor of Ariobarzanes I, murdered some time before 51 BC
- Ariobarzanes III of Cappadocia, son and successor of Ariobarzanes II, who ruled from ca. 51 BC until his execution in 42 BC

== Kings and monarchs of Media Atropatene and Armenia ==
- Ariobarzanes I of Media Atropatene, ruled from 65 BC to 56 BC, father and predecessor of Artavasdes I of Media Atropatene
- Ariobarzanes II of Atropatene, grandson of Ariobarzanes I, king of Media Atropatene from 20 BC to 8 BC, and king of Armenia from 2 BC to AD 4
- Gaius Julius Ariobarzanes I (flourished second half of 1st century BC & first half of 1st century), son of Ariobarzanes II and grandson of Artavasdes I
- Gaius Julius Ariobarzanes II, possible son of Gaius Julius Ariobarzanes I and possible grandson of Ariobarzanes II of Atropatene

== See also ==
- Barzanes
