= Theban–Spartan War =

4th-century BCE conflict between Thebes and Sparta

Theban-Spartan War
- Part of the Spartan hegemony and the Theban hegemony
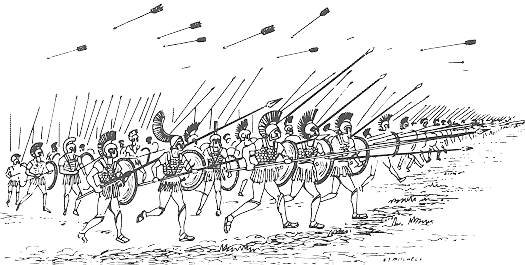
- Hoplites in combat
Date	378–362 BC
Location	Mainland Greece
Result	Theban victory; End of Spartan hegemony; Start of Theban hegemony

Belligerents
Sparta and allies Supported by: Achaemenid Empire	Thebes and allies Supported by: Achaemenid Empire

Commanders and leaders
Agesilaus and others	Epaminondas; Pelopidas

The Theban–Spartan War of 378–362 BC was a series of military conflicts fought between Sparta and Thebes for hegemony over Greece. In 378 BC, led by General Epaminondas, Thebes revolted against its Spartan garrison and successfully repelled Spartan offensives. A clever tactician, Epaminondas crushed the hitherto invincible Spartan army at Leuctra in 371 BC, thereby ending Sparta's hegemony and starting Thebes' own hegemony over Greece. After Leuctra, the war continued in the Peloponnese, where Sparta was fighting for survival. In 362 BC, the Battle of Mantinea was a new victory for Thebes, but Epaminondas was also killed. The conflict ended soon after with a treaty of general peace signed by all the belligerents, except Sparta, which was by now isolated and permanently weakened.

== Background ==
Sparta had emerged victorious from the Peloponnesian War against Athens (431–404 BC), and occupied a hegemonic position over Greece. However, the Spartans' violent interventionism upset their former allies, especially Thebes and Corinth. The resulting Corinthian War (395–387 BC) ended with a difficult Spartan victory, but the Boeotian League headed by Thebes was also disbanded.

After the end of the Corinthian War, which had seen many of Sparta’s allies abandon her, Sparta began reconstructing its hegemony and punishing many disloyal allies. In 385 BC Sparta attacked Mantinea claiming they had failed to fulfil their allied obligations. When Sparta took the city they split it into four settlements, as that was what it had used to be. In the north the city of Olynthus grew in power and violated the terms agreed upon at the end of the Corinthian War. Because of this Sparta sent an army against the city under the command of Phoebidas. When the army was in Boeotia around 383 or 382 BC, Leontiades, who was leader of the oligarchic party in Thebes, asked Phoebidas to occupy the Theban Citadel as Leontiades felt threatened by the democratic party. The Spartans were ruled by kings and, therefore, were supportive of oligarchic governments in other Greek cities. Because of this Phoebidas agreed, occupying the city and practically taking control of Thebes.

Upon the seizure of the Theban citadel by the Spartans, Pelopidas and other leading Theban democrats fled to Athens where Pelopidas took the lead in a conspiracy to liberate Thebes. In 379 BC the democratic party surprised and killed their chief political opponents in Thebes (members of the aristocratic party that supported the Spartans), and roused the people against the Spartan garrison, which surrendered to an army gathered by Pelopidas.

== 379/378 BC – Theban coup ==
The defeat of the pro-Athens forces and the triumph of Sparta in the preceding Corinthian War (394–386 BC) was especially disastrous to Thebes, as the general settlement of 387 BC, called the Peace of Antalcidas or "King's Peace", stipulated the complete autonomy of all Greek towns and so withdrew the other Boeotians from the political control of Thebes. The power of Thebes was further curtailed in 382 BC, when a Spartan force led by Phoebidas occupied the citadel by a treacherous coup de main. When the Theban citadel was seized by the Spartans (383 or 382 BC) with the help of their aristocratic supporters in the city-state, who killed the democratic leader Ismenias and forced his aristocratic allies to run away from the city with hundreds of their supporters. Pelopidas and other leading Theban democrats fled to Athens where, years later, the Theban polemarch Leontiades sent assassins to prevent the exiles from returning; the assassins only managed to kill the democratic leader Androcleides. Pelopidas took the lead in a conspiracy to liberate Thebes by killing the oligarchs.

Meanwhile, in Thebes, Epaminondas began preparing the young men of the city to become warriors, giving them a proper training despite their social rank. In the winter of 379 BC, a small group of the exiles, led by Pelopidas, infiltrated the city. They then assassinated the leaders of the pro-Spartan government, and supported by Epaminondas and Gorgidas, who led a group of young men and surrounded the Spartans on the Cadmeia. Pelopidas and allies managed to kill Leontidas and his aristocrat allies. The following day, Epaminondas and Gorgidas brought Pelopidas and his men before the Theban assembly and exhorted the Thebans to fight for their freedom; the assembly responded by acclaiming Pelopidas and his men as liberators. The Cadmeia was surrounded, and the Spartans attacked; Pelopidas realised that they must be expelled before an army came from Sparta to relieve them. The Spartan garrison eventually surrendered on the condition that they were allowed to march away unharmed. The narrow margin of the conspirators' success is demonstrated by the fact that the Spartan garrison met a Spartan force on the way to rescue them as they marched back to Sparta. Plutarch portrays the Theban coup as an immensely significant event:

...the subsequent change in the political situation made this exploit the more glorious. For the war which broke down the pretensions of Sparta and put an end to her supremacy by land and sea, began from that night, in which people, not by surprising any fort or castle or citadel, but by coming into a private house with eleven others, loosed and broke in pieces, if the truth may be expressed in a metaphor, the fetters of the Lacedaemonian supremacy, which were thought indissoluble and not to be broken.

== Boeotian War ==
Boeotian War
- Part of the Theban–Spartan War
Date	378–371 BC
Location	Mainland Greece
Result	Theban victory; Spartan hegemony overthrown; Start of Theban hegemony

Belligerents
Sparta • Peloponnesian League	Thebes • Boeotian League; Athens

Commanders and leaders
Agesilaus II; Cleombrotus I †	Chabrias; Gorgidas; Pelopidas; Epaminondas

The Boeotian War broke out in 378 BC as the result of the revolt in Thebes against Sparta. The war saw Thebes become dominant in the Greek world at the expense of Sparta. However, by the end of the war, Thebes’ greatest leaders, Pelopidas and Epaminondas, were both dead and Thebes' power already waning, allowing for the rise of Macedon.

=== Outbreak (378 BC) ===
Sparta immediately sent against Thebes a force under one of their kings, Cleombrotus, in the middle of winter. As the border fort of Eleutherae was held by an Athenian garrison, he was forced to enter Boeotia through Mount Cithaeron, where he wiped out a force of Theban democrats. After passing through the allied cities of Plataea and Thespiae, Cleombrotus's force camped at Cynoscephalae (6 km west of Thebes) to await events. The Athenians were alarmed at Cleombrotus's presence nearby, and, seeking to placate Sparta, immediately punished their own generals who had aided the Theban coup. It was probably around this time, likely due to fear that Athens would not offer support, that Thebes sent an embassy to Sparta, offering to rejoin the Peloponnesian League in return for recognition of its new government. Cleombrotus inflicted no damage to Theban territory, as he apparently hoped for a reconciliation, but the government at Sparta, led by the other king, the anti-Theban hardliner Agesilaus, would have nothing less than the punishment of the coup leaders and the restoration of a pro-Spartan regime, terms which Thebes rejected.

Whatever negotiations Cleombrotus may have initiated on his own came to nothing, and, once it became apparent after 16 days that neither Thebes nor Athens would offer a challenge, he ended the campaign, retiring unhindered by way of Creusis and Aigosthena. Although Athens had not yet committed itself, it was soon the target of an act of Spartan aggression which brought it firmly to the Theban camp. Sphodrias, the harmost (governor) whom Cleombrotus had left in command of a Spartan remnant garrisoned at Thespiae, launched an officially unauthorized nighttime raid on the Athenian port of Piraeus. The attack was a fiasco, as the Spartans were still a distance away from their objective when dawn broke, and Sphodrias had to content himself with plundering the Attic countryside while retreating. According to varying accounts, Sphodrias had either been enticed by a Theban bribe, aimed at forcing Athens to become more belligerent, or acted upon secret orders from Cleombrotus. A Spartan delegation in Athens, which had been probably sent earlier by Agesilaus to assess Athenian intentions, professed ignorance of the attack, but Sphodrias was then unexpectedly acquitted by the home government. Athens declared that Sparta had broken the peace and prepared for war.

=== Invasions of Agesilaus II ===
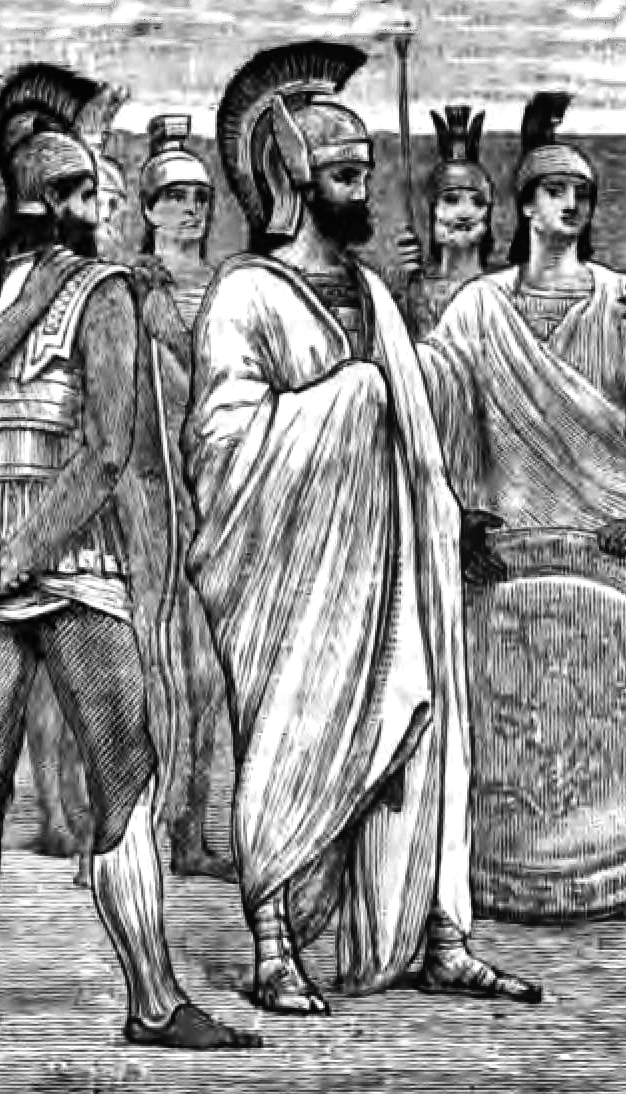
Spartan King Agesilaus II

Sparta called upon all its allies and, led by Agesilaus, invaded Boeotia in the spring of 378. The Thebans and their commander, Gorgidas, had decided to resist the Spartans and screen their city by setting up, probably with aid of the Athenians, a continuous trench and palisade that stretched from the border with Thespiae in the west, alongside the northern bank of the Asopus in the south, to the border with Tanagra in the east.

The Sacred Band first saw action in 378 BC, at the beginning of the Boeotian War. It was during the famous stand-off between the Athenian mercenary commander (and later strategos) Chabrias (d. 357 BC) and the Spartan King Agesilaus II (444 BC–360 BC). Prior to the creation of the Sacred Band under Gorgidas, the Athenians had helped the Theban exiles retake control of Thebes and the citadel of Cadmea from Sparta. This was followed by Athens openly entering into an alliance with Thebes against Sparta. In the summer of 378 BC, Agesilaus led a Spartan expedition against Thebes from the Boeotian city of Thespiae (then still allied to Sparta). His force consisted of 1,500 cavalry and 28,000 infantry. At least 20,000 of the infantry were hoplites, while 500 were of the elite band of Sciritae (Σκιρῖται) light infantry vanguard. Learning of the impending invasion, Athens quickly came to the aid of Thebes by sending a force of about 200 cavalry and 5,000 men (both citizen and mercenary, including hoplites and peltasts) under the command of the Athenian strategos Demeas and mercenary commander Chabrias.

Agesilaus probed the stockade looking for weak points, moving his camp around it and devastating the land outside, while the Thebans and Athenians sent out repeated forays to harass his forces. After getting a measure of the defenders' movements and having them grow used to his own movements, the King surprised them by marching at daybreak and crossed the stockade at an undefended position before the enemy could reach him. Agesilaus then encountered a Theban and Athenian force set up on a defensive position in a hill some 3 1/2 km southwest of Thebes. He dispersed their light troops and brought his army uphill to threaten the enemy, but the latter, led by the Athenian Chabrias, defiantly stood their ground in a defensive and provocative manner. Gorgidas and the Sacred Band occupied the front ranks of the Theban forces on the right, while Chabrias and an experienced force of mercenary hoplites occupied the front ranks of the Athenian forces on the left. Agesilaus first sent out skirmishers to test the combined Theban and Athenian lines. These were easily dispatched by the Theban and Athenian forces, probably by their more numerous cavalry. Agesilaus then commanded the entire Spartan army to advance. He may have hoped that the sight of the massed Spartan forces resolutely moving forward would be enough to intimidate the Theban and Athenian forces into breaking ranks. The same tactic had worked for Agesilaus against Argive forces in the Battle of Coronea (394 BC). It was during this time that Chabrias gave his most famous command. With scarcely 200 m (660 ft) separating the two armies, Agesilaus was expecting the Theban and Athenian forces to charge at any moment. Instead, Chabrias ordered his men to stand at ease. In unison, his mercenary hoplites immediately assumed the resting posture—with the spear remaining pointing upwards instead of towards the enemy, and the shield propped against the left knee instead of being hoisted at the shoulders. Gorgidas, on seeing this, also commanded the Sacred Band to follow suit, which they did with the same military drill precision and confidence. The audacity of the maneuver and the discipline of the execution was such that Agesilaus halted the advance.

Unwilling to charge uphill against a strong opponent, Agesilaus decided not to engage the enemy and, his bluff called, continued devastating Theban territory, reaching the walls of the city itself.

Seeing that his attempts to provoke the Theban and Athenian forces to fight on lower ground were unsuccessful, Agesilaus eventually thought it wiser to withdraw his forces back to Thespiae. Xenophon and Diodorus both mention that Agesilaus nevertheless boasted of being the "unchallenged champion", claiming it was a Spartan victory since his enemies declined to accept his invitation to battle. Diodorus notes, however, that this was merely to mollify his followers who were discouraged at their king's failure to engage a smaller force. Chabrias, in contrast, was being praised for his novel strategy and was seen as a savior by the Thebans.

After Agesilaus's departure, Phoebidas, whom he had left as commander of the garrison at Thespiae, continued raiding enemy territory, which prompted Gorgidas to bring his entire Theban force and plunder the surroundings of Thespiae in retaliation. Gorgidas was then surprised and put to flight by Phoebidas, but successfully regrouped at the Thespios (Kanavari) river valley and counterattacked his pursuers there, killing Phoebidas and chasing the Spartans back to Thespiae.

Shortly after the stand-off in Thebes, Agesilaus disbanded his army in Thespiae and returned to Peloponnese through Megara. He left the Spartan general Phoebidas as his harmost (ἁρμοστής, a military governor) at Thespiae. Phoebidas was the same general responsible for the unauthorized seizure of the citadel of Cadmea in 382 BC, in violation of the Peace of Antalcidas in place then. Agesilaus previously refused to punish Phoebidas (though he was fined), which have led some modern historians to believe that Phoebidas' earlier actions were under the direct command of the king.

The Thebans under Gorgidas slaughtered 200 men that Agesilaus left near Thespiae as an outpost (προφυλακή). He also made several attacks on Thespian territory, though these accomplished little. Phoebidas, on his part, started making various raids into Theban territory using the Spartans under his command and Thespian conscripts. These forays became so destructive that by the end of the summer, the Thebans went out in force against Thespiae under the command of Gorgidas. Phoebidas engaged the advancing Theban army with his peltasts. The harrying of the light infantry apparently proved too much for the Thebans and they started to retreat. Phoebidas, hoping for a rout, rashly pursued them closely. However, the Theban forces suddenly turned around and charged Phoebidas' forces. Phoebidas was killed by the Theban cavalry. His peltasts broke ranks and fled back to Thespiae pursued by Theban forces.

There are three records of these engagements with Phoebidas and Gorgidas surviving today. Xenophon and Diodorus both say that Phoebidas died during Gorgidas' abrupt turn-around. Diodorus records that the Spartans and Thespians lost 500 men. Xenophon claims that only a few of the Thespians were killed and that the maneuver of Gorgidas was out of necessity, not deliberate. The account of Polyaenus is almost identical to that of Xenophon and Diodorus but claims instead that Phoebidas survived and implies that the initial Theban retreat was a deliberate ruse by Gorgidas. Nonetheless, at the death of Phoebidas, the Spartans sent a new mora (μόρα, the largest tactical unit in ancient Spartan armies) under a polemarchos (πολέμαρχος, the commander of a mora) by sea to replace the losses in the Thespian garrison. Aside from Polyaenus, none of these accounts mention the Sacred Band by name, but given that they were under the command of Gorgidas, they are likely to have been part of Theban forces involved.

In 377, Agesilaus was once again in command of the Peloponnesian forces. After a series of skirmishes which he won with some difficulty, he was forced again to withdraw when the Theban army came out full force as he approached the city. Diodorus observes at this point that the Thebans thereafter faced the Spartans with confidence. Gorgidas disappears from history between 377 and 375, during which the command of the Sacred Band was apparently transferred to Pelopidas. (Note: The historian Louis Crompton presumes that Gorgidas died in a skirmish in 378 BC. (Crompton, 2006))

Agesilaus implemented a ruse against the Theban army to bypass their stockade unopposed. After arriving at Plataea, he sent word to Thespiae requesting that a market be set up for his troops, but, once the Thebans went that way to await his arrival, he instead marched eastwards at dawn to Erythrae and Scolus, slipping past the stockade at an undefended point. He began laying waste to enemy territory which had not been ravaged the previous year, before reaching the Spartan-held territory of Tanagra. Turning back westward, Agesilaus found the Theban army formed up in a hill named Graos Stethos (probably the modern Golemi), but he ignored them and marched straight to Thebes itself. Fearing for their city's safety, the Thebans abandoned their hill and marched back home by way of Potniae, but despite being harried by the Spartans they reached Thebes first. As Agesilaus retired to Thespiae, his Olynthian cavalry inflicted some casualties on a group of enemy peltasts after the Athenian Chabrias refused to risk his hoplites in support.

Although Agesilaus's scorched earth tactics caused severe food shortages at Thebes, his campaigns accomplished little else. He had failed to decisively engage the enemy or to capture Thebes, and his depredations had the effect of strengthening the resolve of the affected Boeotian communities against Sparta. Sparta's allies meanwhile grew increasingly dissatisfied with the constant and fruitless campaigning. A change in policy was made after the aged Agesilaus, while on a pause at Megara on the way back to Sparta, became afflicted with an illness which left him incapacited for years. Encouraged by the other king, Cleombrotus, Sparta shifted its focus from Thebes on land to Athens at sea.

=== Spartan setbacks ===
An expedition in 376 BC led by King Cleombrotus was blocked at the passes of Cithaeron. As the Spartans failed to get over the Cithaeron Mountains, this gave the Thebans the chance to take the attack to the Spartans, and in doing so they conquered the Spartans' remaining strongholds in Boeotia while the Spartan base in Thespiae was also lost. The Spartans were only left with some land in the south and Orchomenus in the north-west.

Because the Spartans were having a hard time attacking Thebes over land, they decided to change their strategy and rather use a naval force to try to block support for the Athenians. In response, the Athenians sent a powerful fleet towards Sparta. The Spartan general Pollis then led his small fleet to try to stop the siege, but was killed during a naval battle against the Athenian general Chabrias. This naval victory was the first ever victory by an Athenian naval fleet since the Peloponnesian War. Later in 376 BC Chabrias raided Laconia, and possibly reached Sellasia, which is to the north-east of Sparta. In 375 BC Athens mounted two successful expeditions - one into the northern Aegean under Chabrias and a second which sailed around the Peloponnese to western Greece. This force was led by Timotheos, son of Conon, who won the battle of Alyzeia in Acarnania.

=== Battle of Tegyra ===
Map of ancient Boeotia showing the location of the city of Orchomenus

As a single unit under Pelopidas, the first recorded victory of the Sacred Band was at the Battle of Tegyra (375 BC). It occurred near the Boeotian city of Orchomenus, then still an ally of Sparta. Hearing reports that the Spartan garrison in Orchomenus had left for Locris, Pelopidas quickly set out with the Sacred Band and a few cavalry, hoping to capture it in their absence. They approached the city through the northeastern route since the waters of Lake Copais were at their fullest during that season. Upon reaching the city, they learned that a new mora had been sent from Sparta to reinforce Orchomenus. Unwilling to engage the new garrison, Pelopidas decided to retreat back to Thebes, retracing their northeastern route along Lake Copais. However, they only reached as far as the shrine of Apollo of Tegyra before encountering the returning Spartan forces from Locris.

The Spartans were composed of two morai led by the polemarchoi Gorgoleon and Theopompus. (Note: The historian P.J. Stylianou believes that only one Spartan mora was defeated in the battle, and that accounts of two morai is a result of the inadvertent inclusion of the second mora in Orchomenus which might have moved out to intercept Pelopidas after he defeated the first one, though they never met in battle. (Stylianou, 1998)) They outnumbered the Thebans at least two to one. According to Plutarch, upon seeing the Spartans, one of Thebans allegedly told Pelopidas "We are fallen into our enemy's hands;" to which Pelopidas replied, "And why not they into ours?" He then ordered his cavalry to ride up from the rear and charge while he reformed the Sacred Band into an abnormally dense formation, hoping to at least cut through the numerically superior Spartan lines. The Spartans advanced, confident in their numbers, only to have their leaders killed immediately in the opening clashes. Leaderless and encountering forces equal in discipline and training for the first time in the Sacred Band, the Spartans faltered and opened their ranks, expecting the Thebans to pass through and escape. Instead, Pelopidas surprised them by using the opening to flank the Spartans. The Spartans were completely routed, with considerable loss of life. The Thebans didn't pursue the fleeing survivors, mindful of the remaining Spartan mora stationed in Orchomenus less than 5 km (3.1 mi) away. They stripped the dead and set up a tropaion (τρόπαιον, a commemorative trophy left at the site of a battle victory) before continuing on to Thebes. Having proven their worth, Pelopidas kept the Sacred Band as a separate tactical unit in all subsequent battles.

An account of the battle was mentioned both by Diodorus and Plutarch, both based heavily on the report by Ephorus. Xenophon conspicuously omits any mention of the Theban victory in his Hellenica, though this has traditionally been ascribed to Xenophon's strong anti-Theban and pro-Spartan sentiments. An obscure allusion to Orchomenus in Hellenica, however, implies that Xenophon was aware of the Spartan defeat.

The exact number of the belligerents on each side varies by account. Diodorus puts the number of Thebans at 500 against the Spartan's 1000 (each mora consisting of 500 men), apparently basing it on Ephorus' original figures. Plutarch puts the number of the Thebans at 300, and acknowledges three sources for the number of Spartans: 1000 by the account of Ephorus; 1,400 by Callisthenes (c. 360–328 BC); or 1,800 by Polybius (c. 200–118 BC). Some of these numbers may have been exaggerated due to the overall significance of the battle. The battle, while minor, was remarkable for being the first time a Spartan force had been defeated in pitched battle, dispelling the myth of Spartan invincibility. It left a deep impression in Greece and boosted the morale among Boeotians, foreshadowing the later Battle of Leuctra. In Plutarch's own words:

For in all the great wars there had ever been against Greeks or barbarians, the Spartans were never before beaten by a smaller company than their own; nor, indeed, in a set battle, when their number was equal. Hence their courage was thought irresistible, and their high repute before the battle made a conquest already of enemies, who thought themselves no match for the men of Sparta even on equal terms. But this battle first taught the other Greeks, that not only Eurotas, or the country between Babyce and Cnacion, (Note: Places where the Spartan Assembly met.) breeds men of courage and resolution; but that where the youth are ashamed of baseness, and ready to venture in a good cause, where they fly disgrace more than danger, there, wherever it be, are found the bravest and most formidable opponents.

— Plutarch, Pelopidas 17

Shortly after this, the Athenians initiated the Common Peace of 375 BC (Κοινὴ Εἰρήνη, Koine Eirene) among Greek city-states. According to Xenophon, they were alarmed at the growing power of Thebes and weary of fending off Spartan fleets alone as the Thebans were not contributing any money to maintaining the Athenian fleet. However this broke down soon after in 374 BC, when Athens and Sparta resumed hostilities over Korkyra (modern Corfu). During this time period, Athens also gradually became hostile to Thebes. While Athens and Sparta were busy fighting each other, Thebes resumed her campaigns against the autonomous pro-Spartan Boeotian poleis. Thespiae and Tanagra were subjugated and formally became part of the reestablished democratic Boeotian confederacy. In 373 BC, Thebans under the command of the boeotarch Neocles attacked and razed its traditional rival, the Boeotian city of Plataea. The Plataean citizens were allowed to leave alive, but they were reduced to being refugees and sought sanctuary in Athens. Of the pro-Spartan Boeotian poleis, only Orchomenus remained.

By this time, Thebes had also started attacking Phocian poleis allied to Sparta. Pelopidas is again mentioned as the commander of the abortive Theban siege of the Phocian city of Elateia (c. 372 BC). In response to the Theban army outside the city's walls, the Phocian general Onomarchus brought out all the inhabitants of the city (including the elderly, women, and children) and locked the gates. He then placed the non-combatants directly behind the defenders of Elateia. On seeing this, Pelopidas withdrew his forces, recognizing that the Phocians would fight to the death to protect their loved ones.

By 371 BC, there was another attempt to revive the King's Peace to curb the rise of Thebes. It was initiated by either the Athenians or the Persians (perhaps at the prompting of the Spartans). The Spartans also sent a large force led by King Cleombrotus I (Spartans have two kings simultaneously) to Phocis, ready to invade Boeotia if the Thebans refuse to attend the peace conference or accept its terms. (Note: Other historians believe that Cleombrotus was already in Phocis during this period, having been sent earlier in 375 BC to reinforce it during the early Theban attacks. (Rhodes, 2006))

=== 378–371 BC – Aftermath ===
When news of the uprising at Thebes reached Sparta, an army under Cleombrotus I had been dispatched to subdue the city, but turned back without engaging the Thebans. Another army under Agesilaus II was then dispatched to attack the Thebans. However, the Thebans refused to meet the Spartan army in battle, instead building a trench and stockade outside Thebes, which they occupied, preventing the Spartans advancing on the city. The Spartans ravaged the countryside but eventually departed, leaving Thebes independent. This victory so heartened the Thebans that they undertook operations against other neighboring cities as well. In short order the Thebans were able to reconstitute their old Boeotian confederacy in a new, democratic form. The cities of Boeotia united as a federation with an executive body composed of seven generals, or Boeotarchs, elected from seven districts throughout Boeotia. This political fusion was so successful that henceforth the names Theban and Boeotian were used interchangeably in a nod to the newfound solidarity of the region.

Seeking to crush the Thebans, the Spartans would invade Boeotia three times over the next few years (378, 377, ? possibly Leuctra). At first the Thebans feared facing the Spartans head on, but the conflict gave them much practice and training, and they "had their spirits roused and their bodies thoroughly inured to hardships, and gained experience and courage from their constant struggles". Although Sparta remained the dominant land power in Greece, the Boeotians had demonstrated that they, too, were a martial threat and a politically cohesive power. At the same time, Pelopidas, an advocate of an aggressive policy against Sparta, had established himself as a major political leader in Thebes.

Epaminondas's role in the years to 371 BC is difficult to piece together. Certainly, he served with the Theban armies in the defence of Boeotia in the 370s, and, by 371 BC, he had become a Boeotarch. It seems safe to assume, given their close friendship, and their close collaboration after 371 BC, that Epaminondas and Pelopidas also collaborated closely on Theban policy in the period 378–371 BC.

=== Peace conferences ===
The years following the Theban coup had seen desultory fighting between Sparta and Thebes, with Athens also drawn into the conflict. In 375 BC there was a renewal of the King's Peace, but this lasted but a few months. The capture of Plataea by the Thebans put the Theban-Athenian Alliance under strain, as the Plataeans were expelled from their city and found asylum in Athens, where they were a strong voice against Thebes. Though the alliance held, Athens insisted on negotiations with Sparta. A peace treaty was agreed but significant disagreements arose at the treaty signing. Epaminondas insisted that he should sign for the Boeotians as a whole rather than just for Thebes. In response, the Spartan king Agesilaus struck the name of Thebes off the list of signatories. Both sides then left the conference and prepared for renewed hostilities. Desultory fighting between Athens and Sparta had resumed by 373 BC (at the latest). By 371 BC, Athens and Sparta were again war-weary, and in 371 BC a conference was held at Sparta to discuss another attempt at a common peace.

Epaminondas was serving as a Boeotarch for 371 BC, and led the Boeotian delegation to the peace conference. Peace terms were agreed at the outset of the conference, and the Thebans presumably signed the treaty in their own name alone. However, on the following day, Epaminondas caused a drastic break with Sparta when he insisted on signing not for the Thebans alone, but for all the Boeotians. Agesilaus refused to allow the change of the Theban envoys' signature, insisting that the cities of Boeotia should be independent; Epaminondas countered that if this were to be the case, the cities of Laconia should be as well. Irate, Agesilaus struck the Thebans from the document. The delegation returned to Thebes, and both sides mobilized for war.

=== Battle of Leuctra (371 BC) ===
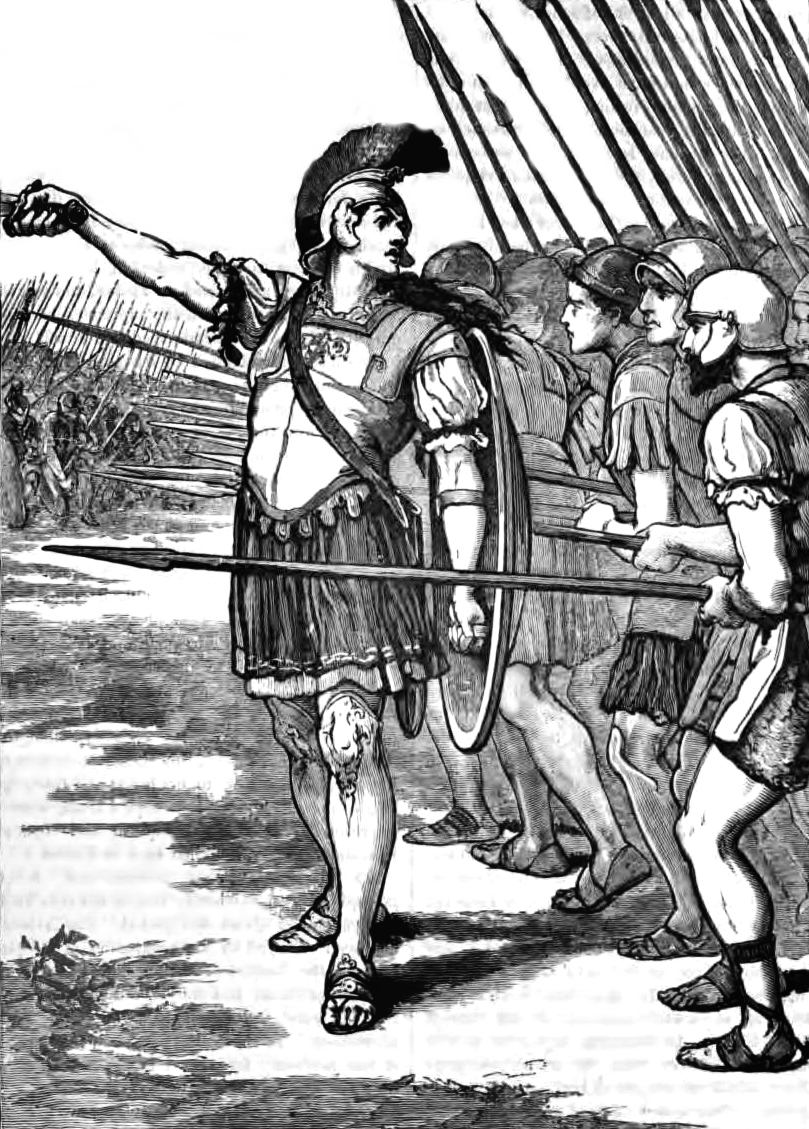
Pelopidas leading the Thebans at the Battle of Leuctra

Immediately following the failure of the peace talks, orders were sent out from Sparta to the Spartan king Cleombrotus, who was at the head of an army in Phocis, commanding him to march directly to Boeotia. Skirting north to avoid mountain passes where the Boeotians were prepared to ambush him, Cleombrotus entered Boeotian territory from an unexpected direction and quickly seized a fort and captured 10 or 12 triremes. Then marching towards Thebes, he camped at Leuctra, in the territory of Thespiae. Here, the Boeotian army came to meet him. The Spartan army contained some 10,000 hoplites, 700 of whom were the elite warriors known as Spartiates. The Boeotians opposite them numbered about 6,000, but were bolstered by a cavalry superior to that of the Peloponnesians.

Epaminondas was given charge of the Boeotian army, with the other six Boeotarchs in an advisory capacity. Pelopidas, meanwhile, was captain of the Sacred Band, the elite Theban troops. Before the battle, there was evidently much debate amongst the Boeotarchs about whether to fight or not. As a consistent advocate of an aggressive policy, Epaminondas wished to fight, and supported by Pelopidas, he managed to swing the vote in favour of battle. During the course of the battle, Epaminondas was to display a grasp of tactics hitherto unseen in Greek warfare.

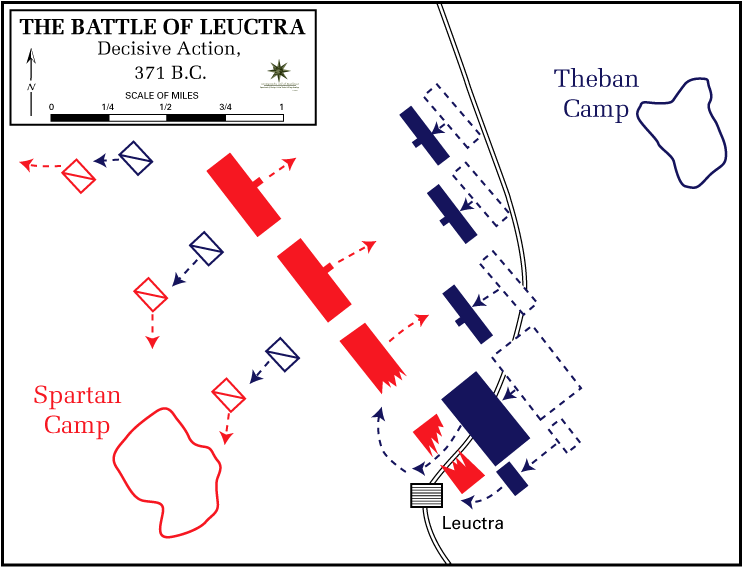
The Battle of Leuctra, 371 BC, showing Epaminondas's tactical advances

The phalanx formation used by Greek armies had a distinct tendency to veer to the right during battle, "because fear makes each man do his best to shelter his unarmed side with the shield of the man next him on the right". Traditionally, a phalanx therefore lined up for battle with the elite troops on the right flank to counter this tendency. Thus, in the Spartan phalanx at Leuctra, Cleombrotus and the elite 'Spartiates' were on the right, while the less experienced Peloponnesian allies were on the left. However, needing to counter the Spartans' numerical advantage, Epaminondas implemented two tactical innovations. Firstly, he took the best troops in the army, and arranged them 50 ranks deep (as opposed to the normal 8–12 ranks) on the left wing, opposite Cleombrotus and the Spartans, with Pelopidas and the Sacred Band on the extreme left flank. Secondly, recognizing, that he could not have matched the width of the Peloponnesian phalanx (even before the deepening the left flank), he abandoned all attempts to do so. Instead, placing the weaker troops on the right flank, he "instructed them to avoid battle and withdraw gradually during the enemy's attack". The tactic of the deep phalanx had previously been used by Pagondas, another Theban general, who used a 25 man deep formation at the Battle of Delium. However, the reversing of the position of the elite troops, and an oblique line of attack were innovations; it seems that Epaminondas was therefore responsible for the military tactic of refusing one's flank.

The fighting at Leuctra opened with a clash between the cavalry, in which the Thebans were victorious over the inferior Spartan cavalry, driving them back into the ranks of the infantry, and thereby disrupting the phalanx. The battle then became general, with the strengthened Theban left flank marching to attack at double speed, while the right flank retreated. After intense fighting, the Spartan right flank began to give way under the impetus of the mass of Thebans, and Cleombrotus was killed. Although the Spartans held on for long enough to rescue the body of the king, their line was soon broken by the sheer force of the Theban assault. The Peloponnesian allies on the left wing, seeing the Spartans put to flight, also broke and ran, and the entire army retreated in disarray. One thousand Peloponnesians were killed, while the Boeotians lost only 300 men. Most importantly, since it constituted a significant proportion of the entire Spartan manpower, 400 of the 700 Spartiates present were killed, a loss that posed a serious threat to Sparta's future war-making abilities. When, after the battle, the Spartans asked if they and the Peloponnesians could collect the dead, Epaminondas suspected that the Spartans would try to cover-up the scale of their losses. He therefore allowed the Peloponnesians to remove their dead first, so that those remaining would be shown to be Spartiates, and emphasise the scale of the Theban victory.

The victory at Leuctra shook the foundations of the Spartan dominance of Greece to the core. Since the number of Spartiates was always relatively small, Sparta had relied on her allies in order to field substantial armies. However, with the defeat at Leuctra, the Peloponnesian allies were less inclined to bow to Spartan demands. Furthermore, with the loss of men at Leuctra and other battles, the Spartans were not in a strong position to reassert their dominance over their erstwhile allies. Spartan supremacy was effectively overthrown and a new era of Theban hegemony was set up.

== Theban hegemony ==
In the immediate aftermath of Leuctra, the Thebans considered following up their victory by taking their vengeance on Sparta; they also invited Athens to join them in doing so. However, their Thessalian allies under Jason of Pherae dissuaded them from shattering what remained of the Spartan army. Instead, Epaminondas occupied himself with consolidating the Boeotian confederacy, compelling the previously Spartan-aligned polis of Orchomenus to join the league.

The following year the Thebans invaded the Peloponnesus, aiming to break Spartan power for good. It is not clear exactly when the Thebans started to think not just of ending the Spartan hegemony, but of replacing it with one of their own, but it is clear that eventually this became their aim. Hans Beck asserts that, unlike Sparta in the Peloponnesian League and Athens in the Delian League, Thebes made no effort either to create an empire or to bind its allies in any sort of permanent and stable organization. Indeed, after Leuctra Thebes devoted its attention to diplomatic efforts in Central Greece rather than schemes of domination further afield. By late 370 Thebes' network of alliances in central Greece made her secure in the area—as she had not been before Leuctra—and offered scope for further expansion of Theban influence.

=== First Invasion of the Peloponnese (370 BC) ===
When, in the immediate aftermath of Leuctra, the Thebans had sent a herald to Athens with news of their victory, the messenger was met with stony silence. The Athenians then decided to take advantage of the Spartan discomfiture, holding a conference in Athens, in which the peace terms proposed earlier in 371 BC were ratified by all cities (except Elis); and this time, the treaty explicitly made the Peloponnesian cities, formerly under Spartan dominance, independent. Taking advantage of this, the Mantineans decided to unify their settlements into a single city, and to fortify it; a decision which greatly angered Agesilaus. Furthermore, Tegea, supported by Mantinea, instigated the formation of an Arcadian alliance. This led to the Spartans declaring war on Mantinea, whereupon the majority of Arcadian cities grouped together to oppose the Spartans (thus forming the confederation that the Spartans were trying to prevent), and requested assistance from the Thebans. The Theban force arrived late in 370 BC, and it was led by Epaminondas and Pelopidas, both at this time Boeotarchs. As they journeyed into Arcadia, the Thebans were joined by armed contingents from many of Sparta's former allies, swelling their forces to some 50–70,000 men. In Arcadia Epaminondas encouraged the Arcadians to form their proposed league, and to build the new city of Megalopolis (as a center of power opposed to Sparta).

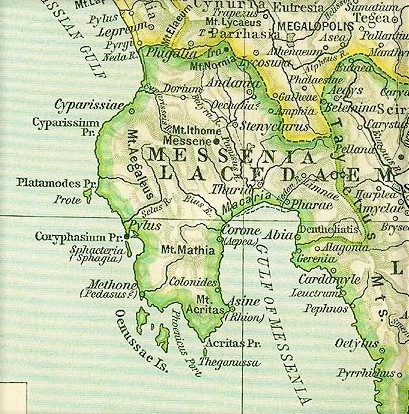
Messenia in the classical period

Epaminondas, supported by Pelopidas and the Arcadians, then persuaded the other Boeotarchs to invade Laconia itself. Moving south, they crossed the Evrotas River, the frontier of Sparta, which no hostile army had breached in memory. The Spartans, unwilling to engage the massive army in battle, simply defended their city, which the Thebans did not attempt to capture. The Thebans and their allies ravaged Laconia, down to the port of Gythium, freeing some of the Lacedaemonian perioeci from their allegiance to Sparta. Epaminondas briefly returned to Arcadia, before marching south again, this time to Messenia, a region which the Spartans had conquered some 200 years before. Epaminondas freed the helots of Messenia, and rebuilt the ancient city of Messene on Mount Ithome, with fortifications that were among the strongest in Greece. He then issued a call to Messenian exiles all over Greece to return and rebuild their homeland. The loss of Messenia was particularly damaging to the Spartans, since the territory comprised one-third of Sparta's territory and contained half of their helot population. The helots' labor allowed the Spartans to become a "full-time" army.

Epaminondas' campaign of 370/369 has been described as an example of "the grand strategy of indirect approach", which was aimed at severing "the economic roots of her [Sparta's] military supremacy." In mere months, Epaminondas had created two new enemy states that opposed Sparta, shaken the foundations of Sparta's economy, and all but devastated Sparta's prestige. This accomplished, he led his army back home, victorious.

=== Trial ===
In order to accomplish all that he wished in the Peloponnesus, Epaminondas had persuaded his fellow Boeotarchs to remain in the field for several months after their term of office had expired. Upon his return home, Epaminondas was therefore greeted not with a hero's welcome but with a trial arranged by his political enemies. According to Cornelius Nepos, in his defense Epaminondas merely requested that, if he be executed, the inscription regarding the verdict read:

Epaminondas was punished by the Thebans with death, because he obliged them to overthrow the Lacedaemonians at Leuctra, whom, before he was general, none of the Boeotians durst look upon in the field, and because he not only, by one battle, rescued Thebes from destruction, but also secured liberty for all Greece, and brought the power of both people to such a condition, that the Thebans attacked Sparta, and the Lacedaemonians were content if they could save their lives; nor did he cease to prosecute the war, till, after settling Messene, he shut up Sparta with a close siege.

The jury broke into laughter, the charges were dropped, and Epaminondas was re-elected as Boeotarch for the next year.

=== Second invasion of the Peloponnese (369 BC) ===
In 369 BC the Argives, Eleans and the Arcadians, eager to continue their war against Sparta, recalled the Thebans to their support. Epaminondas, at the height of his prestige, again commanded an allied invasion force. Arriving at the Isthmus of Corinth, the Thebans found it heavily guarded by the Spartans and Athenians (along with the Corinthians, Megarans and Pellenians). Epaminondas decided to attack the weakest spot, guarded by the Lacedaemonians; in a dawn attack he forced his way through the Spartan position, and joined his Peloponnesian allies. The Thebans thus won an easy victory and crossed the Isthmus. Diodorus stresses that this was "a feat no whit inferior to his former mighty deeds".

However, the rest of the expedition achieved little: Sicyon and Pellene became allied to Thebes, and the countryside of Troezen and Epidaurus was ravaged, but the cities could not be taken. After an abortive attack on Corinth and the arrival of a task force of Iberian mercenaries sent by Dionysius of Syracuse to aid Sparta, the Thebans decided to march home.

=== Thessaly (368 BC) ===
When Epaminondas returned to Thebes, he continued to be dogged by his political enemies who prosecuted him for the second time. They actually succeeded in excluding him from the office of Boeotarch for the year 368 BC. This was the only time from the Battle of Leuctra until his death that he did not serve as Boeotarch. In 368, the Theban army marched into Thessaly to rescue Pelopidas and Ismenias, who had been imprisoned by Alexander of Pherae while serving as ambassadors. The Theban force not only failed to overcome Alexander and his allies, but got into serious difficulties when it tried to withdraw; Epaminondas, serving as a private soldier, succeeded in extricating it. In early 367, Epaminondas led a second Theban expedition to free Pelopidas and Ismenias. He finally outmaneuvered the Thessalians and secured the release of the two Theban ambassadors without a fight.

=== Third invasion of the Peloponnese (367 BC) ===
In the spring of 367 BC, Epaminondas again invaded the Peloponnesus. This time an Argive army captured part of the Isthmus on Epaminondas's request, allowing the Theban army to enter the Peloponnesus unhindered. On this occasion, Epaminondas marched to Achaea, seeking to secure their allegiance to Thebes. No army dared to challenge him in the field, and the Achaean oligarchies therefore acquiesced to the request that they be allied to Thebes. Epaminondas' acceptance of the Achaean oligarchies roused protests by both the Arcadians and his political rivals, and his settlement was thus shortly reversed: democracies were set up, and the oligarchs exiled. These democratic governments were short-lived, since the pro-Spartan aristocrats from all the cities banded together and attacked each city in turn, re-establishing the oligarchies. According to G.L. Cawkwell, "the sequel perhaps showed the good sense of Epaminondas. When these exiles recovered the cities, they 'no longer took a middle course'." In the light of their treatment by Thebes, they abandoned their previously neutral stance, and thereafter "fought zealously in support of the Lacedaemonians".

=== Achaemenid attempt at mediation (368–366 BC) ===
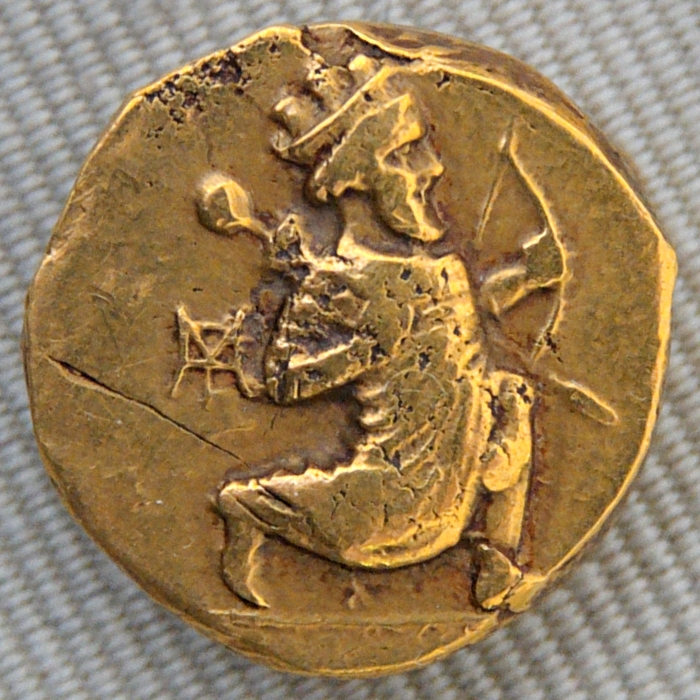
Achaemenid envoy Philiscus of Abydos provided important Achaemenid funds to Sparta and Athens. Daric of Artaxerxes II.

In 367/365 BC an attempt was made to make a common peace, with the Persian King Artaxerxes II as arbiter and guarantor, through the envoy Philiscus of Abydos. This was a second attempt to use the power of the Achaemenid king to influence a new King's Peace as in the Peloponnesian War. Thebes organized a conference to have the terms of the peace accepted, but their diplomatic initiative failed: the negotiations could not resolve the hostility between Thebes and other states that resented its influence (such as the Arcadian leader Lycomedes who challenged the right of the Thebans to hold the congress in Thebes); the peace was never fully accepted, and fighting soon resumed. The negotiation collapsed when Thebes refused to return Messenia to the Spartans.

After the negotiations had failed, Philiscus used Achaemenid funds to finance an army for the Spartans, suggesting that he was acting in support of the Spartans from the beginning. With the Achaemenid financing of a new army, Sparta was able to continue the war. Among the mercenaries whom he had recruited, Philiscus gave 2,000 to the Spartans. He also probably provided funds to the Athenians and promised them, on behalf of the King, to help them recover the Chersonese militarily. Both Philiscus and Ariobarzanes were made citizens of Athens, a remarkable honor suggesting important services rendered to the city-state.

Negotiators from the Greek city states went to the Achaemenid court at Susa for mediation.

During autumn of 367 BC, first the Spartans sent envoys to the Achaemenid capital of Susa (in the persons of Antalcidas and probably Euthycles), soon followed by envoys of the Athenians, the Arcadians, the Argives, the Eleans, the Thebans and other Greek city-states, in attempts to obtain the support of Achaemenid king Artaxerxes II in the Greek conflict. The Achaemenid king proposed a new peace treaty, this time highly tilted in favour of Thebes, which required Messenia to remain independent and that the Athenian fleet to be dismantled. This Peace proposal was rejected by most Greek parties except Thebes. Sparta and Athens, dissatisfied with the Persian king's support of Thebes, decided to provide careful military support to the opponents of the Achaemenid king. Athens and Sparta provided military support for the revolted satraps, in particular Ariobarzanes: Sparta sent a force to Ariobarzanes under an aging Agesilaus II, while Athens sent a force under Timotheus, which was however diverted when it became obvious that Ariobarzanes had entered frontal conflict with the Achaemenid king. An Athenian mercenary force under Chabrias was also sent to the Egyptian Pharaoh Tachos, who was also fighting against the Achaemenid king.

=== Resistance to Thebes ===
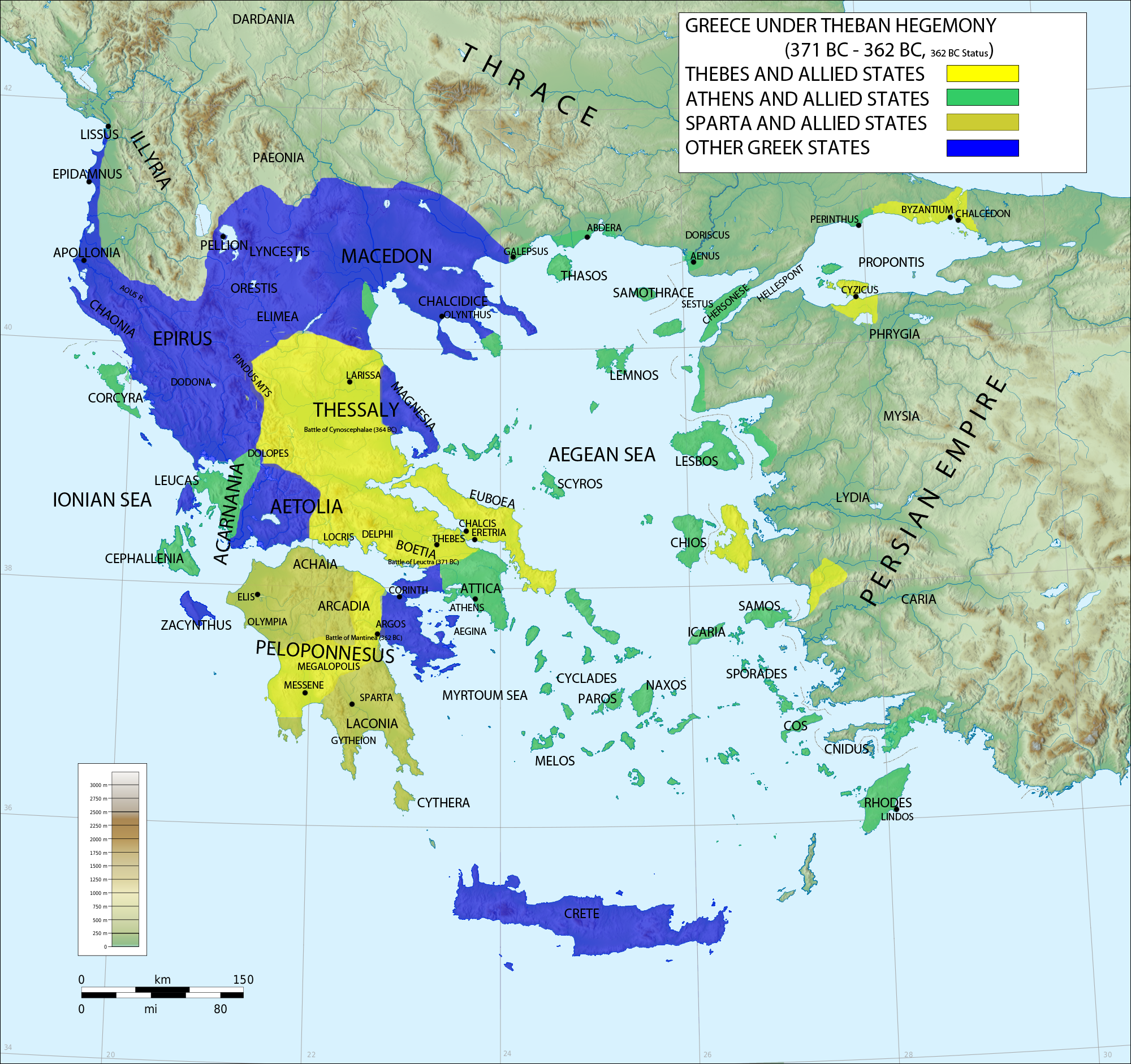
The Theban hegemony; power-blocks in Greece in the decade up to 362 BC

Throughout the decade after the Battle of Leuctra, numerous former allies of Thebes defected to the Spartan alliance or even to alliances with other hostile states. By the middle of the next decade, even some Arcadians (whose league Epaminondas had helped establish in 369 BC) had turned against them. At the same time, however, Epaminondas managed through a series of diplomatic efforts to dismantle the Peloponnesian league: the remaining members of the league finally abandoned Sparta (in 365 Corinth, Epidaurus, and Phlius made peace with Thebes and Argos), and Messenia remained independent and firmly loyal to Thebes.

Boeotian armies campaigned across Greece as opponents rose up on all sides; Epaminondas even led his state in a challenge to Athens at sea. The Theban demos voted him a fleet of a hundred triremes to win over the Rhodes, Chios, and Byzantium. The fleet finally sailed in 364, but modern scholars believe that Epaminondas achieved no lasting gains for Thebes on this voyage. In that same year, Pelopidas was killed in the battle of Cynoscephalae against Alexander of Pherae in Thessaly, despite the victory of his forces. His loss deprived Epaminondas of his greatest Theban political ally.

=== Fourth invasion of the Peloponnese (362 BC) ===
In the face of this increasing opposition to Theban dominance, Epaminondas launched his final expedition into the Peloponnese in 362 BC. The immediate goal of the expedition was to subdue Mantinea, which had been opposing Theban influence in the region. Epaminondas brought an army drawn from Boeotia, Thessaly and Euboea. He was joined by Tegea, which was the center of local opposition to Mantinea, Argos, Messenia, and some of the Arcadians. Mantinea, on the other hand, had requested assistance from Sparta, Athens, Achaea and the rest of Arcadia, so that almost all of Greece was represented on one side or the other.

This time the mere presence of the Theban army was not enough to cow the opposition. Since time was passing and the Mantinean alliance showed no signs of capsizing, Epaminondas decided that he would have to break the stalemate. Hearing that a large Lacedaemonian force was marching to Mantinea, and that Sparta was practically undefended, he planned an audacious night-time march on Sparta itself. However, the Spartan king Archidamus was alerted to this move by an informant, probably a Cretan runner, and Epaminondas arrived to find the city well-defended. Although he did attack the city, he seems to have drawn off relatively quickly on discovering that he had not, after all, surprised the Spartans. Furthermore, the Lacedaemonian and Mantinean troops which had been stationed at Mantinea had marched to Sparta during the course of the day, and dissuaded Epaminondas from attacking again. Now hoping that his adversaries had left Mantinea defenseless in their haste to protect Sparta, Epaminondas counter marched his troops back to his base at Tegea, and then dispatched his cavalry to Mantinea. However, a clash outside the walls of Mantinea with Athenian cavalry foiled this strategy as well. Realising that the time allotted for the campaign was drawing to a close, and reasoning that if he departed without defeating the enemies of Tegea, Theban influence in the Peloponnesus would be destroyed, he decided to stake everything on a pitched battle.

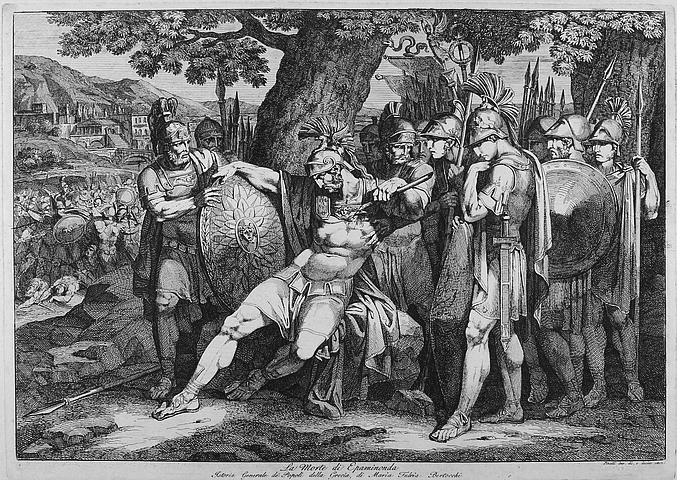
The death of Epaminondas at the Battle of Mantinea

What followed on the plain in front of Mantinea was the largest hoplite battle in Greek history. Epaminondas had the larger army, 30,000 strong infantry and 3,000 cavalry, whilst his opponents numbered 20,000 infantry and 2,000 cavalry. Xenophon says that, having decided to fight, Epaminondas arranged the army into battle order, and then marched it in a column parallel to the Mantinean lines, so that it appeared that the army was marching elsewhere, and would not fight that day. Having reached a certain point in the march, he then had the army down arms, so it appeared they getting ready to camp. Xenophon suggests that "by so doing he caused among most of the enemy a relaxation of their mental readiness for fighting, and likewise a relaxation of their readiness as regards their array for battle". The whole column, which had been marching right-to-left past the front of the Mantinean army then 'right-faced', so that they were now in a battle line, facing the Mantineans. Epaminondas, who had been at the head of the column (now the left wing), brought some companies of infantry from the extreme right wing, behind the battle line, to reinforce the left wing. By this, he recreated the strengthened left-wing that the Thebes had fielded at Leuctra (this time probably made up by all the Boeotians, and not just the Thebans as at Leuctra). On the wings he placed strong forces of cavalry strengthened by light-infantry.

Epaminondas then gave the order to advance, catching the enemy off guard, and causing a furious scramble in the Mantinean camp to prepare for battle. The battle unfolded as Epaminondas had planned. The cavalry forces on the wings drove back the Athenian and Mantinean cavalry opposite them. Diodorus says that the Athenian cavalry on the Mantinean right wing, although not inferior in quality, could not withstand the missiles from the light-troops that Epaminondas had placed among the Theban cavalry. Meanwhile, the Theban infantry advanced. Xenophon evocatively describes Epaminondas's thinking: "[he] led forward his army prow on, like a trireme, believing that if he could strike and cut through anywhere, he would destroy the entire army of his adversaries." As at Leuctra, the weakened right wing was ordered to hold back and avoid fighting. In the clash of infantry, the issue briefly hung in the balance, but then the Theban left-wing broke through the Spartan line, and the entire enemy phalanx was put to flight. However, at the height of the battle, Epaminondas was mortally wounded by a Spartan, and died shortly thereafter. Following his death, the Thebes and allies made no effort to pursue the fleeing enemy; a testament to Epaminondas's centrality to the war effort.

Xenophon, who ends his history with the Battle of Mantinea, says of the battle's results:

When these things had taken place, the opposite of what all men believed would happen was brought to pass. For since well-nigh all the people of Greece had come together and formed themselves in opposing lines, there was no one who did not suppose that if a battle were fought, those who proved victorious would be the rulers and those who were defeated would be their subjects; but the deity so ordered it that both parties set up a trophy as though victorious and neither tried to hinder those who set them up, that both gave back the dead under a truce as though victorious, and both received back their dead under a truce as though defeated, and that while each party claimed to be victorious, neither was found to be any better off, as regards either additional territory, or city, or sway, than before the battle took place; but there was even more confusion and disorder in Greece after the battle than before.

== Athens and the Theban Wars ==
Sparta's interference and invasion of Thebes in 382 BC gave the latter a very good reason to join the league. However her behaviour within the league became difficult and Athens started to realise that Thebes was not necessarily to be trusted. For example, Thebes destroyed Plataea in 372 BC, which had only recently been refounded. Athens started to think about negotiating peace with Sparta; it was while Athens was discussing this with Sparta that Thebes defeated the Spartan army conclusively at Battle of Leuctra (371 BC).

In 378 BC a Spartan attempt to seize Piraeus brought Athens closer to Thebes. The Athenian mercenary commander Chabrias successfully faced off the larger army of Agesilaus II near Thebes. At the advance of Agesilaus' forces, instead of giving the order to charge, Chabrias famously ordered his men at ease—with the spear remaining pointing upwards instead of towards the enemy, and the shield leaning against the left knee instead of being hoisted against the shoulder. The command was followed immediately and without question by the mercenaries under his command, to be copied by their counterparts beside them, the elite Sacred Band of Thebes under the command of Gorgidas. This "show of contempt" stopped the advancing Spartan forces, and shortly afterwards Agesilaus withdrew.

Athens allied itself with Thebes and formed the Second Athenian League. The confederacy included most of the Boeotian cities and some of the Ionian islands. In 377 BC Athens, in preparing for participation in the Spartan–Theban struggle, reorganised its finances and its taxation, inaugurating a system whereby the richer citizens were responsible for the collection of taxes from the less rich. In 376 BC Chabrias won a naval victory for Athens over the Spartan fleet off the island of Naxos.

In 374 BC Athens tried to retire from the Theban–Spartan war and made peace with Sparta. However, the peace was quickly broken when Sparta attacked Corcyra, enlisting Syracusan help, forcing Athens to come to the island's aid. The Athenian general, Timotheus, captured Corcyra and defeated the Spartans at sea off Alyzia (Acarnania).

In the peace conference of 371 BC, Athens supported the Spartans' refusal to allow the Thebans to sign the treaty on behalf of all Boeotia. Consequently, Athens did not welcome the Theban victory at Leuctra, fearing the rising aggressiveness of Thebes. After the Theban victory, the old alliance between the Persians and the Thebans was restored. In 370 BC, when Agesilaus II invaded Arcadia, the Arcadians first turned to Athens for help, but when it fell on deaf ears, Arcadia turned to the Thebans, causing the first Theban invasion of the Peloponnese.

== Bibliography ==
=== Ancient sources ===
- Atheneus, Deipnosophistae
- Cornelius Nepos, Epaminondas
- Diodorus Siculus, Bibliotheca Historica
- Pausanias, Description of Greece
- Plutarch, Parallel Lives
- Plutarch, Moralia
- Xenophon (1890s) [original 4th century BC]. Hellenica . Translated by Henry Graham Dakyns – via Wikisource.

=== Modern sources ===
- Beck, Hans (2008). Central Greece and the Politics of Power in the Fourth Century BC. Cambridge University Press. ISBN 978-0-521-83705-7.
- Bose, Partha Sarathi (2004). "Introduction". Alexander the Great's Art of Strategy. Gotham. ISBN 978-1-59240-053-9.
- Buckler, John (2003). Aegean Greece in the Fourth Century BC. Leiden: Brill. doi:10.1163/9789047400103. ISBN 90-04-09785-6. S2CID 152530445.
- Buckley, Terry (1996). "The Main Literary Sources". Aspects of Greek history, 750–323 BC. Routledge. ISBN 978-0-415-09958-5.
- Cartledge, Paul (1979). "The Reduction of Lakonia". Sparta and Lakonia. Routledge. ISBN 978-0-7100-0377-5.
- Cawkwell, George (1979). "Introduction". A history of my times (Hellenica). Penguin Classics. ISBN 978-0-14-044175-8.
- Cawkwell, George (November 1972). "Epaminondas and Thebes". The Classical Quarterly. New Series. 22 (2): 254–278. doi:10.1017/S0009838800042063. JSTOR 638208. S2CID 170698566.
- Davis, Paul K. (2001). "Leuctra". 100 Decisive Battles. Oxford University Press US. ISBN 978-0-19-514366-9.
- Fine, John V.A. (1983). The Ancient Greeks: A Critical History. Harvard University Press. ISBN 978-0-385-72059-5.
- Gabriel, Richard A. (2002). "The Greek Way of War: Classical and Imperial Periods". The Great Armies of Antiquity. Greenwood Publishing Group. ISBN 978-0-275-97809-9.
- Gabriel, Richard A. (2001). "Philip II of Macedon". Great Captains of Antiquity. Greenwood Publishing Group. ISBN 978-0-313-31285-4.
- Green, Peter (2007). "Introduction". Alexander the Great and the Hellenistic Age. Orion. ISBN 978-0-7538-2413-9.
- Hanson, Victor Davis (1993). "The General as Hoplite". Hoplites: the Classical Greek Battle Experience. The Free Press. ISBN 978-0-415-09816-8.
- Hanson, Victor Davis (1999). The Soul of Battle: From Ancient Times to the Present Day, How Three Great Liberators Vanquished Tyranny. The Free Press. ISBN 978-0-385-72059-5.
- Hart, Liddell (1954). Strategy. New York: Praeger.
- Holland, Tom (2006). Persian Fire: The First World Empire and the Battle for the West. Doubleday. ISBN 978-0-385-51311-1.
- Hornblower, Simon (2006). "Leuctra to Mantineia and the Revolt of the Satraps". The Greek world, 479–323 BC. Taylor & Francis. ISBN 978-0-416-75000-3.
- Hornblower, Simon; Spawforth, Antony, eds. (2003). "Epaminondas". The Oxford Classical Dictionary. Oxford University Press. ISBN 978-0-19-866172-6.
- Joint Association of Classical Teachers (1984). "Introduction". The World of Athens. Cambridge University Press. ISBN 978-0-521-27389-3.
- Jones, Archer (2001). "Ancient Warfare". The Art of War in the Western World. University of Illinois Press. ISBN 978-0-385-72059-5.
- Kagan, Donald (1990). "Megara and Delium". The Archidamian War. Cornell University Press. ISBN 978-0-8014-9714-8.
- Nigel Kennell, Spartans, a new history, 2010
- Lazenby, J.F. (1993). "The Evidence". The Defence of Greece 490–479 BC. Aris & Phillips Ltd. ISBN 978-0-85668-591-0.
- Luraghi, Nino (2008). "Introduction". The Ancient Messenians. Cambridge University Press. ISBN 978-0-521-85587-7.
- Munn, Mark H. (1987). "Agesilaos' Boiotian Campaigns and the Theban Stockade of 378–377 B. C.". Classical Antiquity. 6 (1): 106–138. doi:10.2307/25010860. JSTOR 25010860.
- Ober, Josiah (1985). "Methods of Waging War". Fortress Attica. BRILL. ISBN 978-90-04-07243-5.
- Roy, J. (2000). "Sparta in the 360s BC". In Edwards, I.E.S.; Lewis, D.M.; Boardman, John; Gadd, Cyril John; Geoffrey, Nicholas; Hammond, Lemprière (eds.). The Cambridge Ancient History: the Fourth Century BC. Cambridge University Press. ISBN 978-0-521-23348-4.
- Hamilton, Charles D. (1991). Agesilaus and the Failure of Spartan Hegemony. Ithaca, NY: Cornell University Press. doi:10.7591/9781501734915. ISBN 0-8014-2540-9.
- Seager, Robin (2000). "The Corinthian War". In Edwards, I.E.S.; Lewis, D.M.; Boardman, John; Gadd, Cyril John; Geoffrey, Nicholas; Hammond, Lemprière (eds.). The Cambridge Ancient History: the Fourth Century BC. Cambridge University Press. ISBN 978-0-521-23348-4.
- Seager, Robin (2000). "The King's Peace and the Second Athenian Confederacy". In Edwards, I.E.S.; Lewis, D.M.; Boardman, John; Gadd, Cyril John; Geoffrey, Nicholas; Hammond, Lemprière (eds.). The Cambridge Ancient History: the Fourth Century BC. Cambridge University Press. ISBN 978-0-521-23348-4.
- Sealey, Raphael (1976). "The Decline of the Spartan Hegemony". A History of the Greek City States, Ca. 700–338 BC. University of California Press. ISBN 978-0-520-03177-7.
- Smith, Williams (2006). "The Supremacy of Thebes". A Smaller History of Greece. Echo Library. ISBN 978-1-84702-481-7.
- Stylianou, P.J. (1998). "Commentary". A Historical Commentary on Diodorus Siculus, Book 15. Oxford University Press. ISBN 978-0-19-815239-2.
- Tritle, Lawrence A. (1997). "Thebes and Central Greece". The Greek World in the Fourth Century. Routledge. ISBN 978-0-415-10582-8.
- Vottero, Guy (1999). "Grandeur et déchéance d'un héros : Épaminondas le Thébain". Dion J. ed., Le Paradoxe du héros ou d'Homère à Malraux, pp. 43–86. ADRA (Nancy-Paris). ISBN 978-2-95097269-9.
- Henry Smith Williams (Ed.) The Historians' History of the World, vol 4
