= Philiscus of Abydos =

4th-century BC Greek tyrant of Abydus

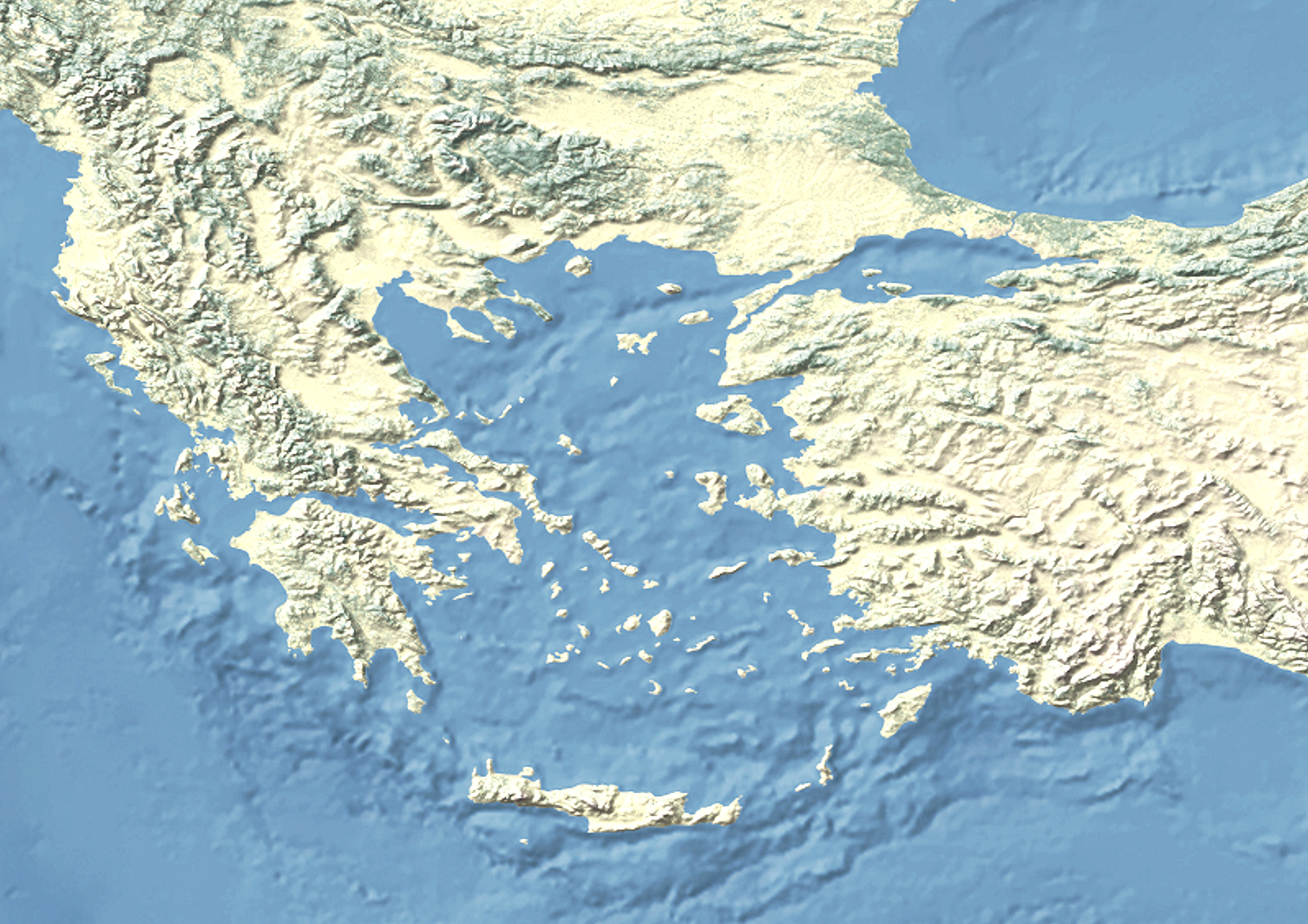
Location of Abydos in northwestern Asia Minor (modern Turkey).

Philiscus or Philiskos (Greek: Φιλίσκος) was a 4th-century BC Greek tyrant of the city of Abydos, on the Asian side of the Hellespont, and a hyparch ("vice-regent") and military commander of the Achaemenid satrap Ariobarzanes. He was sent by Ariobarzanes in 368 BCE as an Achaemenid emissary to Delphi, where the Greek cities at war between themselves had assembled for peace negotiations. Philiscus had probably been sent at the request of either Athens or Sparta, to help solve the conflicts between the Greek city-states.

== Mediation in the Theban conflict (368 BCE) ==
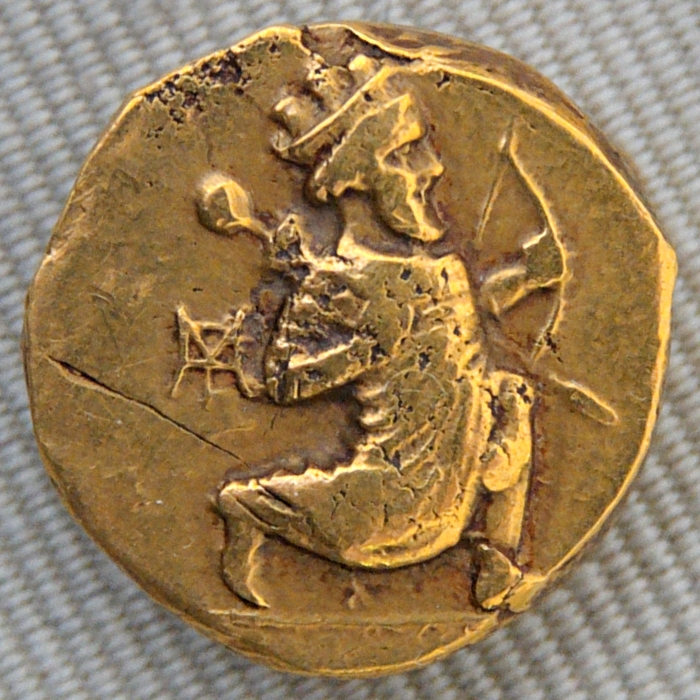
Philiscus of Abydos provided important Achaemenid funds to Sparta and Athens. Daric of Artaxerxes II

Since the Peace of Antalcidas in 386 BCE, conflict in the Greek peninsula had been continuous, and Thebes had become the new dominant power following the victory of Epaminondas over Sparta in the Battle of Leuctra (371 BCE), starting the period of Theban hegemony. Thebes was being feared by both Sparta and Athens, and these two cities tried to use Achaemenid influence as a mediator to resolve the conflicts in Greece, as had been the case with the Peace of Antalcidas.

The objective of Philiscus of Abydos was such to help broker a Common Peace between the Greek belligerents reunited at Delphi. The negotiation collapsed when Thebes refused to return Messenia to the Spartans.

Before returning to Abydos, Philiscus used Achaemenid funds to finance an army for the Spartans, suggesting that he was acting in support of the Spartans from the beginning. With the Achaemenid financing of a new army, Sparta was able to continue the war. Among the mercenaries whom he had recruited, Philiscus gave 2,000 to the Spartans. He also probably provided funds to the Athenians and promised them, on behalf of the King, to help them recover the Thracian Chersonese militarily. Both Philiscus and Ariobarzanes were made citizens of Athens, a remarkable honour suggesting important services rendered to the city-state.

During 367 BCE, the Spartans, and other Greek city states sent envoys to Susa in attempts to obtain the support of Achaemenid king Artaxerxes II in the Greek conflict. The Achaemenid king proposed a new peace treaty, this time highly tilted in favour of Thebes, which required Messenia to remain independent and the Athenian fleet to be dismantled. This peace proposal was rejected by most Greek parties except Thebes.

=== Military actions against the Achaemenid king ===
In the meantime Ariobarzanes revolted against Artaxerxes II in 367/366 BCE.

Sparta and Athens, dissatisfied with the Persian king's support of Thebes, decided to provide careful military support to his opponents. Athens and Sparta provided support for the revolted satraps, in particular Ariobarzanes: Sparta sent a force to Ariobarzanes under an ageing Agesilaus II, while Athens sent a force under Timotheus, which was however diverted when it became obvious that Ariobarzanes had entered frontal conflict with the Achaemenid king. An Athenian mercenary force under Chabrias was also sent to the Egyptian Pharaoh Tachos, who was also fighting against the Achaemenid king.

== Military commander ==
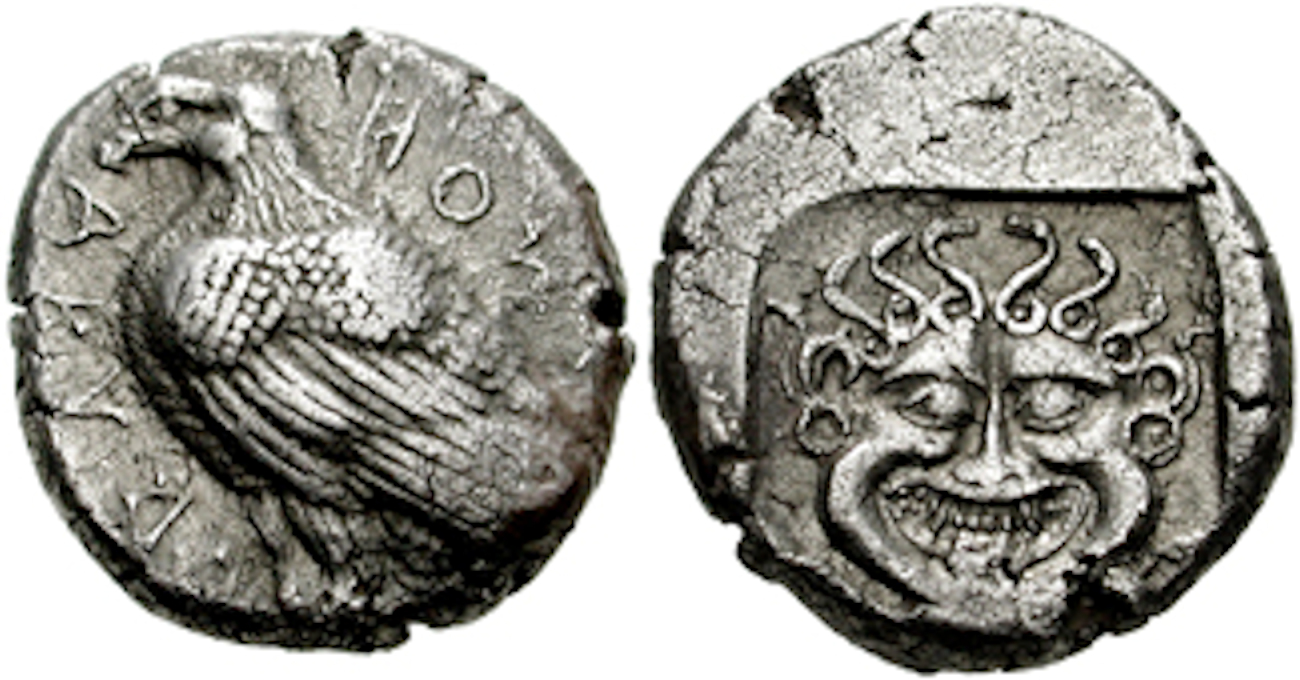
Coinage of Abydos around the time of the tyrant Philiscus. Legend ABVΔ-[H]NON, eagle standing left / Facing gorgoneion with protruding tongue, within incuse square. Circa 480-450 BC

Philiscus later played an important role as a general (hyparch) leading an army of mercenaries in Asia Minor. He led the armies of Ariobarzanes initially, and probably later on his own account after breaking ties with both Ariobarzanes and Athens and siding with the Achaemenid king, into conquering various Greek cities in the Hellespontine area. At one point, he is said to have held the whole Hellespontine area, and to have been "the greatest of hyparchs". In particular he captured the city of Perinthus. He was assassinated by Thersagoras and Execestus of Lampsacus, who were attempting to liberate their city.

A previous tyrant of Abydos, who ruled under Darius I, is known under the name of Daphnis of Abydos. In c. 360 BC, Philiscus was succeeded by the tyrant Iphiades of Abydos.

== Sources ==
- Hansen, Mogens Herman; Nielsen, Thomas Heine (2004). An Inventory of Archaic and Classical Poleis. Oxford University Press. ISBN 9780198140993.
