= Ariobarzanes II of Cius =

4th-century BC Persian noble and governor

Ariobarzanes (in Greek Ἀριoβαρζάνης; ruled 363–337 BC) a Persian noble, succeeded his kinsman or father, Mithridates or alternatively succeeded another Ariobarzanes I of Cius, as ruler of the Greek city of Cius in Mysia, governing for 26 years between 363 BC and 337 BC for the Persian king. It is believed that it was he and his family which in mid-360s BC revolted from the rule of the Persian king Artaxerxes II, but ended up in defeat by 362 BC. He was succeeded as governor of Cius by Mithridates, possibly his son or possibly a kinsman such as a younger brother.

Ariobarzanes is called by Diodorus satrap of Phrygia, and by Nepos satrap of Lydia, Ionia, and Phrygia. Demosthenes speaks of Ariobarzanes of Phrygia and his two or three sons having been made Athenian citizens. He mentions him again in the following year and says that the Athenians had sent Timotheus to his assistance; but that when the Athenian general saw that Ariobarzanes was in open revolt against the Persian king, he refused to assist him.
