= Battle of Naxos =

Sea battle in the Boeotian War (376 BCE)

Coordinates: 37.106821°N 25.375576°E

- Part of the Boeotian War
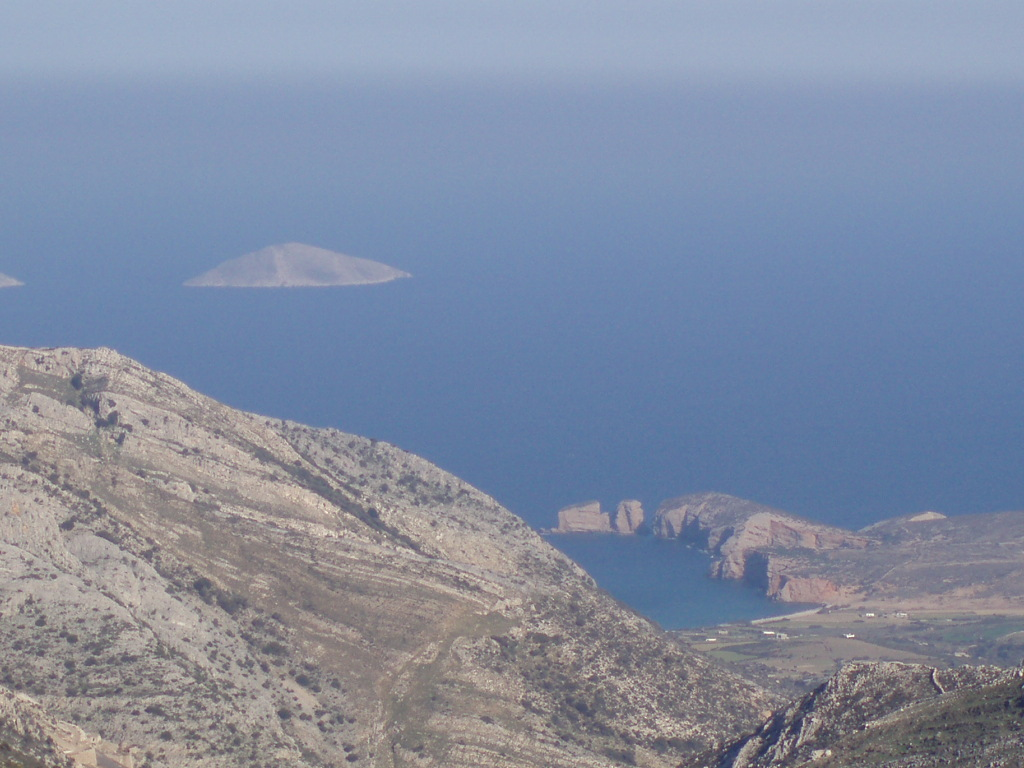
- Azalas bay, and islet Snt Nicolas, east coast of Naxos
Date	376 BC
Location	Naxos
Result	Athenian Victory

Belligerents
Athens	Sparta

Commanders and leaders
Chabrias; Phocion	Unknown
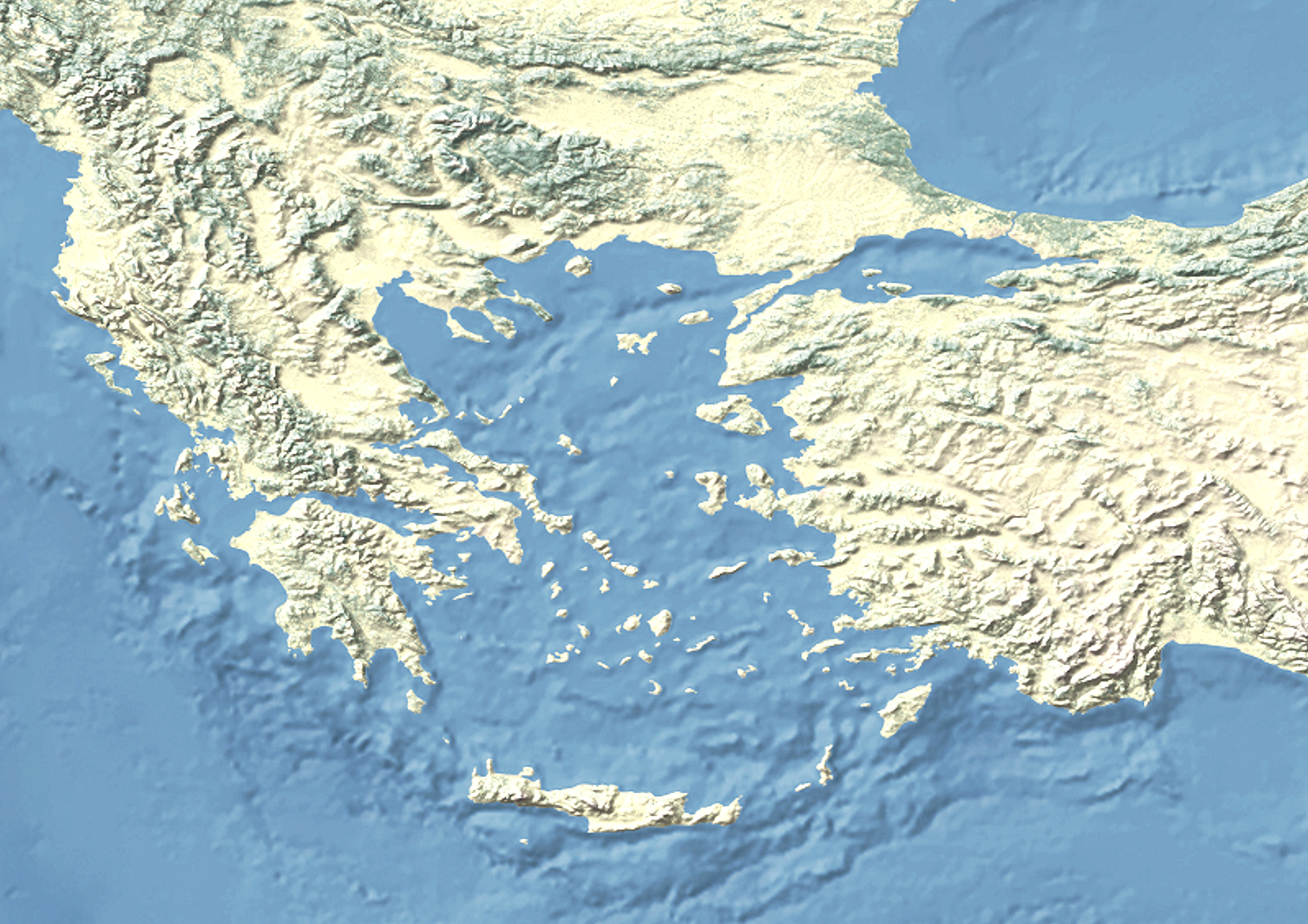
- Location within The Aegean Sea area

At the Battle of Naxos (376 BC) the new Athenian fleet of Chabrias decisively defeated the Spartans. This was the beginning of Athens's recovery of its Aegean hegemony following its loss in the Peloponnesian War. The victory was decided by Phocion's courageous and skillful action on the left wing. In western waters another great Athenian commander, Timotheus, won the battle of Alyzia against Sparta in 374 BC.
