= Barzanes =

Barzanes (Ancient Greek: Βαρζάνης) is the name of multiple people of ancient Near East history:

- Barzanes of Armenia, legendary ruler of ancient Armenia
- Barzanes of Parthia, satrap of Parthia described by the historian Arrian, whom most modern scholars believe is a corruption for Nabarzanes

== See also ==
- Ariobarzanes
