= Charles Vince (journalist) =

English journalist (b.1887)

Charles Vince (born 1887) was an English journalist, who served as a soldier in World War I. He wrote for publications such as the New Statesman and contributed as an editor to the Royal National Lifeboat Institution (RNLI). Vince authored several notable works, including "Wayfarers in Arcady" and "The Crew Were Saved.

== Life ==
He was the son of Charles Anthony Vince.

In World War I, Vince fought with the 59th (2nd North Midland) Division. He wrote in the New Statesman in 1915, on "Stendhal's Waterloo". In the last year of the war, articles by Lieut. Charles Vince appeared in The Straits Times. On 29 September 1918, an article by Lieutenant Charles Vince, in the Swiss French-language paper L'Impartial, discussed the British attitude to peace negotiations.

Vince's career had been in journalism. From 1920 he worked for the Royal National Lifeboat Institution (RNLI), initially as Assistant Secretary for Publicity. He was promoted, on the retirement of George Richard Francis Shee (1869–1939), the Secretary, and became sole editor of The Life-boat, the journal of the Institution. He emphasised human interest and quality photography. When he left in the early 1950s, he was succeeded by Patrick Howarth.

== Works ==
=== World War I ===
Vince contributed the text to England in France; Sketches Mainly with the 59th Division (1919), with illustrations by Sydney Robert Jones, of the Royal Engineers. The narrative starts with the 59th Division's part in the Easter Rising.

=== Books and essays ===
Vince became known as an essayist, particularly for his book of essays Wayfarers in Arcady (1921). It was reviewed by The Spectator. Bruce Charlton described it as

One of the most beautiful, and saddest, books of essays I have seen... For me, this encapsulates the effect that the 1914-18 war had upon an upper class, literary, intelligent, sensitive, somewhat neo-pagan soul. It is extraordinarily well-written - and utterly desolate.

Other works from this period were:

- The Street of Faces: Glimpses of Town (1920), illustrations by John Dean Monroe Harvey.
- Barrie Marvell: His Dreams and Adventures (1922).

=== RNLI ===
- The Lifeboat in Verse (1938), RNLI anthology, with commentary by Sir John Ghest Cumming and Vince.
- The Crew Were Saved (1944), "Britain Advances Series" pamphlet
- Storm on the Waters: The Story of the Life-boat Service in the War of 1939–1945 (1946)
