= Mithridates II of Cius =

Ruler of Cius in Mysia from 337 to 302 BC

Mithridates II of Cius (in Greek Mιθριδάτης or Mιθραδάτης; lived c. 386–302 BC, ruled 337–302 BC) a Persian noble, succeeded his kinsman or father Ariobarzanes II in 337 BC as ruler of the Greek town of Cius in Mysia (today part of Turkey).

== Reign ==
Diodorus assigns him a rule of thirty-five years, but it appears that his rule of Cius was interrupted during that period. What circumstances led to his expulsion or subjection are unknown; nothing is heard of him until his death in 302 BC. However, it appears that he had submitted to the Macedonian Antigonus, who, to prevent him from joining the league of Cassander and his confederates, arranged for his assassination in Cius.

According to Lucian, he was at least eighty-four years of age at the time of his death, which makes it likely that he is the same person as the Mithridates, son of Ariobarzanes, who in his youth circumvented and put to death Datames. King Mithridates I of Pontus was his kinsman, although it is not known whether he was his son.

Therefore, it is likely that he was the same Mithradates, son of Ariobarzanes prince of Cius, who is mentioned by Xenophon as having betrayed his father, and the same circumstance is alluded to by Aristotle. During the Satraps' Revolt in the 360s BC, Mithridates tricked Datames into believing in him. But in the end he arranged for Datames' murder in 362 BC. Similarly, Mithridates gave his own father Ariobarzanes of Phrygia over to his Persian overlord, so Ariobarzanes was crucified in 362 BC.

Of course, he can not be the same Mithridates with the one that accompanied the younger Cyrus in c. 401 BC - there is no proof of this. Neither is he the Mithridates mentioned by Xenophon as satrap of Cappadocia and Lycaonia in the late 5th century BC.

Between 362 and 337 BC the family fiefdom of Cius in Mysia was held by Ariobarzanes II (possibly Mithridates' brother).
