= Charles Vince (Baptist) =

English Baptist minister

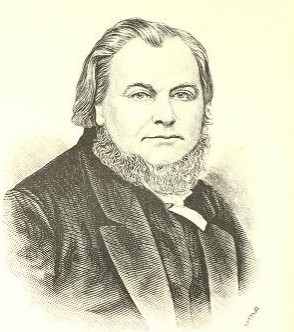
Charles Vince

Charles Vince (1823–1874) was a noted and popular Baptist minister in Birmingham, England, at the Graham Street chapel from 1852 to 1874. He was one of the religious leaders developing Birmingham's Civic Gospel, with his predecessor at the chapel George Dawson, and Henry William Crosskey.

== Life ==
Vince was born in Farnham, Surrey, into a Congregationalist background: his father was a carpenter and builder. He attended a local school, run by a nephew of William Cobbett, became an apprentice to Mason & Jackson, the firm for which his father worked, and joined the local Mechanics' Institute. After a Baptist conversion, he entered Stepney College in 1848. He was then assigned to the Mount Zion Chapel, in Graham Street, Birmingham. He has been described as a "charismatic preacher".

As a figure of the Birmingham "civic renaissance" (or "civic gospel"), a movement promoted by Dawson's supporters, Vince spoke for causes including the Reform League, the National Education League, and the Liberal Association. He was also personally popular as a minister. He defended the radicalism of George Edmonds in an 1868 funeral sermon for him.

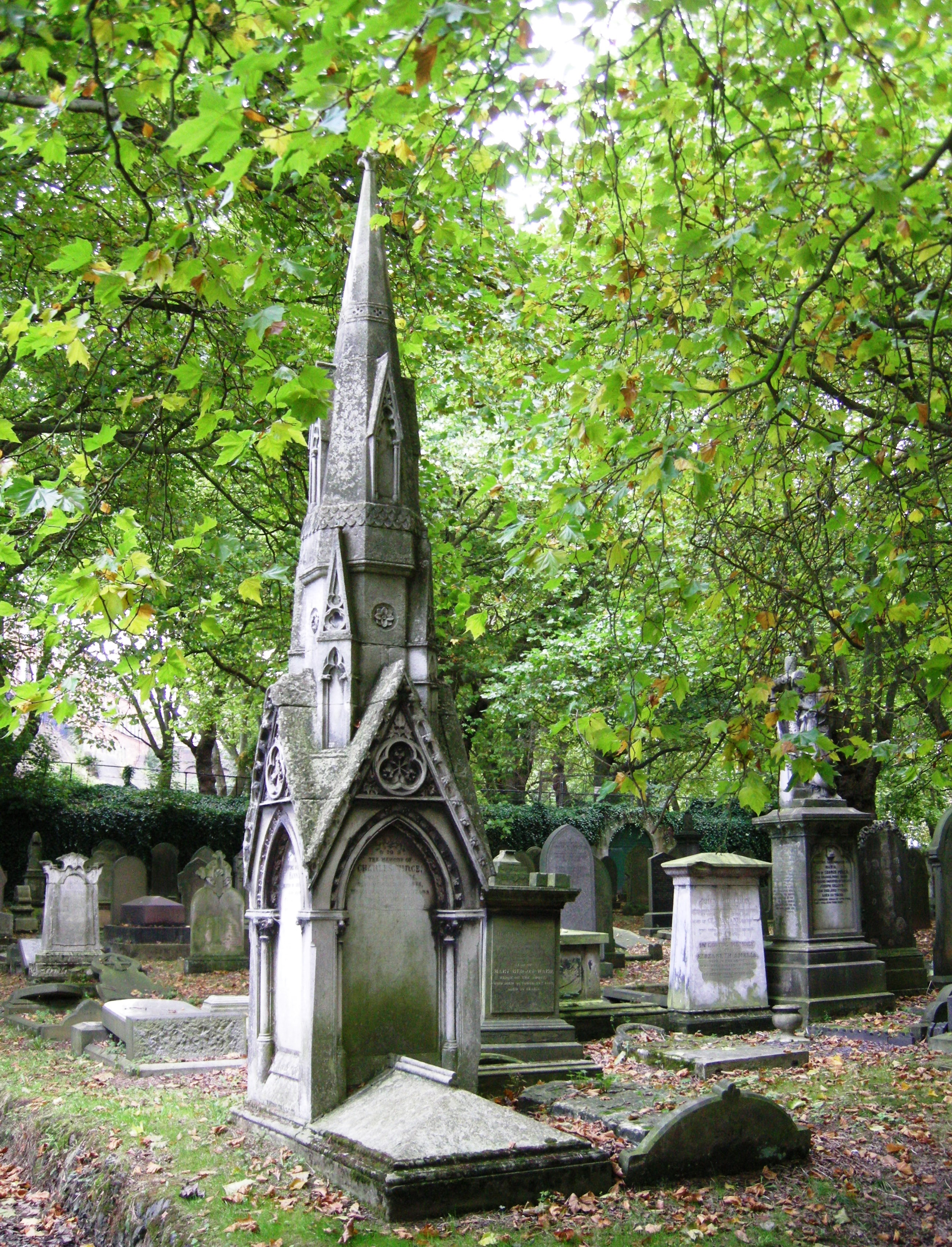
Vince's memorial in Key Hill Cemetery

Vince was an influential participant in Birmingham's social institutions, and a member of Birmingham's first school board. He died on 22 October 1874, at age 51, and was buried at Key Hill Cemetery, Hockley.

== Works ==
- Lessons for Christian labourers from the lives of the Jesuits (1861)
- The Child's Book of Praise (1863)
- Lights and Shadows in the Life of King David (1870)
- The Unchanging Saviour, and other sermons (1875)
- Christian Hymns for Public Worship (1876), with Henry Platten

== Family ==
Vince left a widow and seven children. They included Charles Anthony Vince (born 1855), an academic, head of Mill Hill School, Liberal Unionist and local historian of Birmingham; and James Herbert Vince. The fourth son, W. B. Vince, was a solicitor and worked for the Birmingham Post before dying young.
