= Theban hegemony =

Period of ancient Greek history from 371 to 362 BC

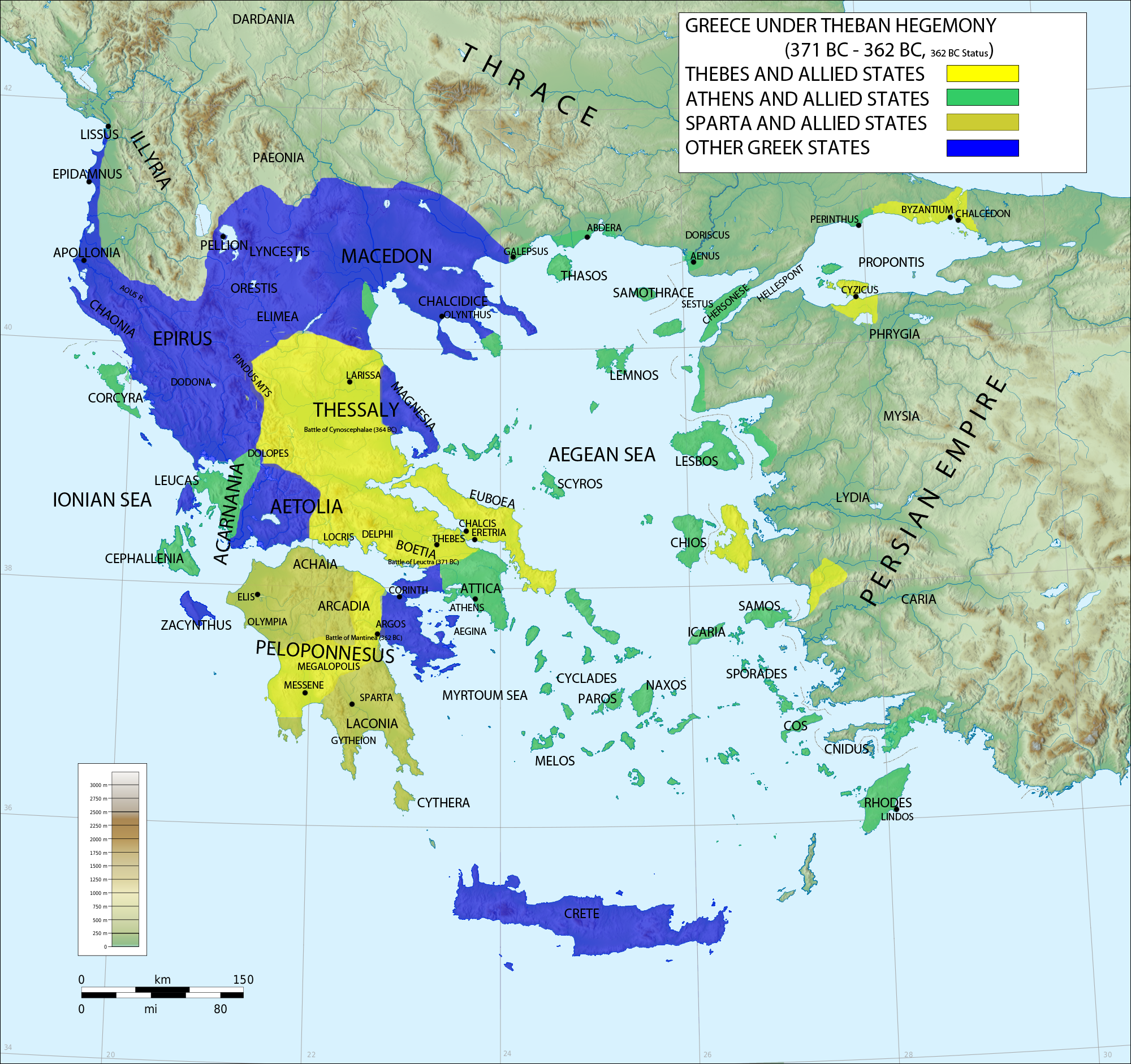
Theban hegemony

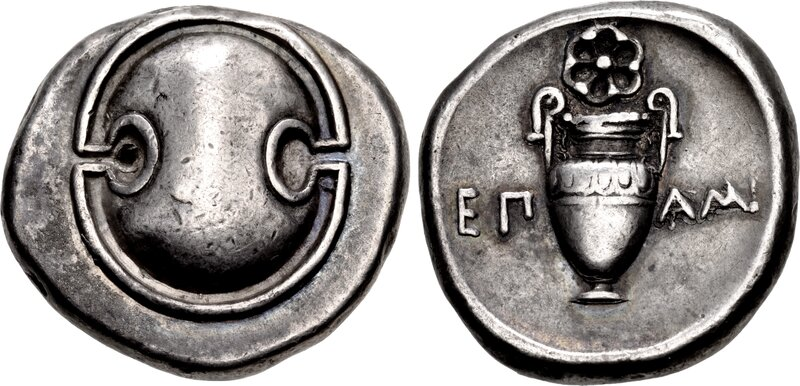
Stater of Thebes minted c.364–362 BC by Epaminondas, whose name EΠ-AMI is inscribed on the reverse.

The Theban hegemony over Greece started from the Theban victory at Leuctra in 371 BC which ended the Spartan hegemony. It ended with the tactical Theban victory at Mantinea in 362 BC, which greatly weakened both sides as Epaminondas was mortally wounded.

== Background ==
The Thebans had traditionally enjoyed the hegemony of the Boeotian League, the federation of Aeolic-speaking Greeks of Boeotia to the immediate north-west of Athenian-dominated Attica. The way was paved for Theban ascendancy by the collapse of Athenian power in the Peloponnesian War and the weakening of the Spartans by their oliganthropia (demographic decline) and by the inconclusive Corinthian War (395–386 BC).

== Epaminondas and Pelopidas ==
Their brief rise to power outside the Boeotian Plain began in 373 when the Boeotians defeated and destroyed the town of Plataea, strategically important as the only Athenian ally in Boeotia. This was taken as a direct challenge by the previous hegemonic power, the Spartans, who gambled on restoring their waning ascendancy by a decisive defeat of the Thebans. At Leuctra the Thebans defeated the invading Spartan army. Out of 700 Spartiates present, 400 died at Leuctra. After this, the Thebans systematically dominated Greece. In the south, they invaded the Peloponnese to liberate the Messenians and Arcadians from Spartan overlordship and set up a pro-Theban Arcadian League to oversee Peloponnesian affairs. In the north, they invaded Thessaly, to crush the growing local power of Pherae and took Philip II, the future king of Macedon, bringing him to Thebes as a hostage. Pelopidas, however was killed at Cynoscephalae, in battle against troops from Pherae, though the battle was won by the Thebans.

== Battle of Mantinea ==
The Thebans overstretched themselves strategically and, in their efforts to maintain control of the north, their power in the south disintegrated. An alliance of Spartans, Athenians and various Peloponnesian towns dissatisfied with Theban rule were defeated at the Battle of Mantinea, but Epaminondas was killed. Sparta lacked the manpower and resources to make any real attempt at regaining its hegemony and Thebes had now lost both of the innovative leaders who had allowed her rise to dominance.

== Aftermath ==
The Thebans sought to maintain their position through diplomacy and their influence at the Amphictyonic council in Delphi, but when this resulted in their former allies the Phocians seizing Delphi and beginning the Third Sacred War (c. 355 BC), Thebes proved too exhausted to bring any conclusion to the conflict. The war was finally ended in 346 BC, by the forces not of Thebes, but of Philip of Macedon, to whom it called for aid, signalling the rise of Macedon. Still, Thebes sought to maintain its leading position until it was finally destroyed by Alexander the Great in 335 BC.

== See also ==
- Boeotian War
- Sacred Band of Thebes
- Macedonian hegemony
