= Peace of Antalcidas =

387 BC peace treaty ending the Corinthian War

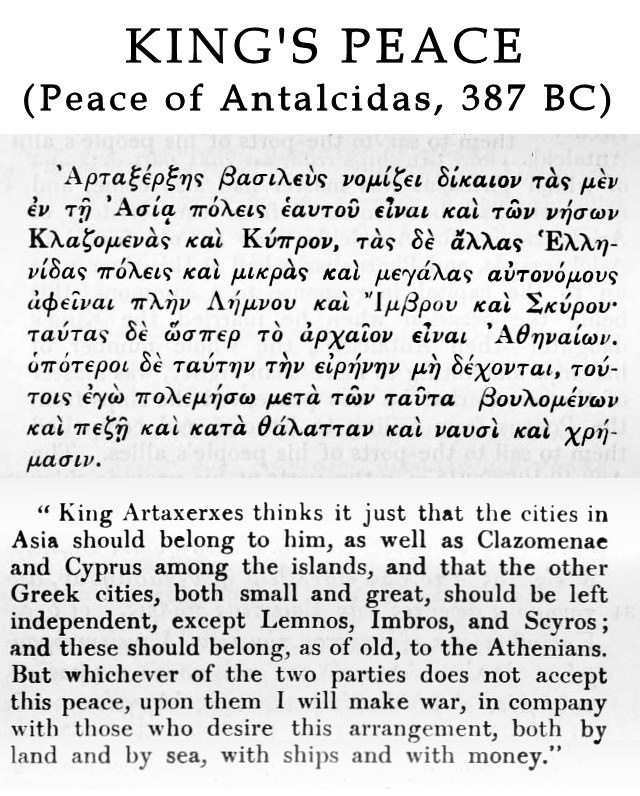
The King's Peace, promulgated by Artaxerxes II in 387 BC, put an end to the Corinthian War under the guarantee of the Achaemenid Empire. Xenophon, Hellenica. The word "independent" in this translation is more generally translated as "autonomous" (αὐτονόμους in the Greek original).

The King's Peace (387 BC) was a peace treaty guaranteed by the Persian King Artaxerxes II that ended the Corinthian War in ancient Greece. The treaty is also known as the Peace of Antalcidas, after Antalcidas, the Spartan diplomat who traveled to Susa to negotiate the terms of the treaty with the king of Achaemenid Persia. The treaty was more commonly known in antiquity, however, as the King's Peace, a name that reflects the depth of Persian influence in the treaty, as Persian gold had driven the preceding war. The treaty was a form of Common Peace, similar to the Thirty Years' Peace which ended the First Peloponnesian War.

== The end of the war ==
By 387 BC, the central front of the Corinthian War had shifted from the Greek mainland to the Aegean, where an Athenian fleet under Thrasybulus had successfully placed a number of cities across the Aegean under Athenian control, and was acting in collaboration with Evagoras, the king of Cyprus. Since Evagoras was an enemy of Persia, and many of the Athenian gains threatened Persian interests, these developments prompted Artaxerxes to switch his support from Athens and her allies to Sparta. Antalcidas, the commander of a Spartan fleet, was summoned to Susa, along with the satrap, Tiribazus. There, the Spartans and Persians worked out the form of an agreement to end the war.

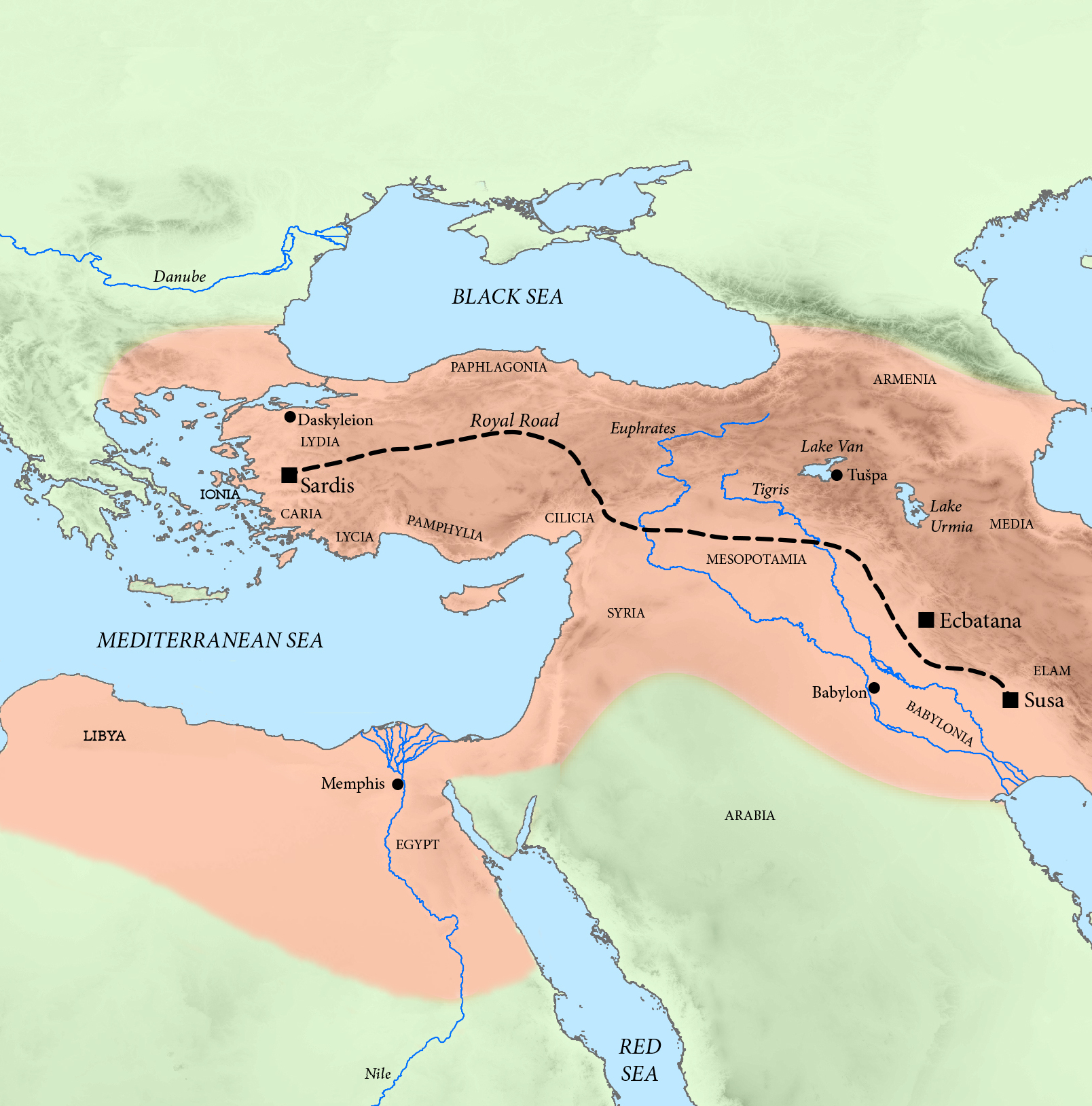
Antalcidas traveled to Susa to negotiate the peace.

To bring the Athenians to the negotiating table, Antalcidas then moved his fleet of 90 ships to the Hellespont, where he could threaten the trade routes along which the Athenians imported grain from the Black Sea region. The Athenians, mindful of their disastrous defeat in 404 BC, when the Spartans had gained control of the Hellespont, agreed to negotiate, and Thebes, Corinth, and Argos, unwilling to fight on without Athens, were also forced to negotiate. In a peace conference at Sparta, all the belligerents agreed to the terms laid down by Artaxerxes.

== Terms of the peace ==
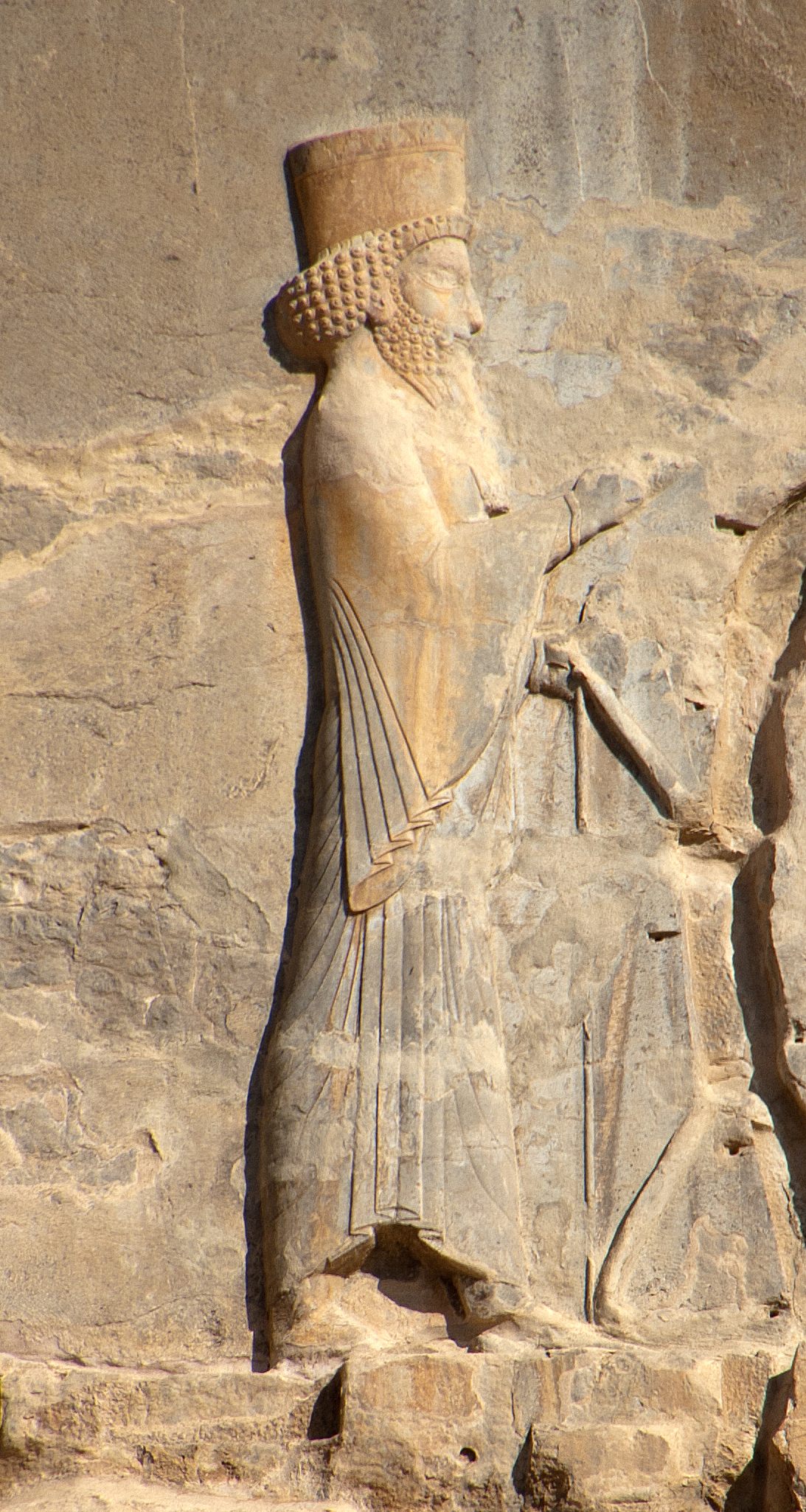
The Peace of Antalcidas was guaranteed by Achaemenid ruler Artaxerxes II.

The most notable feature of the King's Peace is the Persian influence it reflects. The Persian decree that established the terms of the peace, as recorded by Xenophon, clearly shows this:

King Artaxerxes thinks it just that the cities in Asia should belong to him, as well as Clazomenae and Cyprus among the islands, and that the other Greek cities, both small and great, should be left autonomous [αὐτονόμους], except Lemnos, Imbros, and Scyros; and these should belong, as of old, to the Athenians. But whichever of the two parties does not accept this peace, upon them I will make war, in company with those who desire this arrangement, both by land and by sea, with ships and with money.

Ionia and Cyprus were abandoned to the Persians, and the Athenians were compelled to cede their newly-won territories in the Aegean. Equally significantly, the insistence on autonomy put an end to a novel political experiment that had grown out of the war, the union of Argos and Corinth. In what the Greeks called sympoliteia, the two cities had politically merged, granting all citizens joint citizenship. They were forced to separate, and the Thebans were required to disband their Boeotian league. Only Sparta's Peloponnesian League and helots were overlooked, as the Spartans, who were responsible for administering the peace, had no wish to see the principle of independence applied there.

== Effects ==
The single greatest effect of the Peace was the return of firm Persian control over Ionia and parts of the Aegean. Driven back from the Aegean shores by the Delian League during the 5th century, the Persians had been recovering their position since the later part of the Peloponnesian War of 431 to 404 BC, and were now strong enough to dictate terms to Greece. They would maintain this position of strength until the time of Alexander the Great (r. 336 – 323 BC). As Mikhail Gasparov states in his book Greece for Entertainment (Занимательная Греция), "Artaxerxes had succeeded where Xerxes had failed; the Persian King was giving orders in Greece like it was his, and without bringing in a single soldier at that." In short, the treaty placed Greece under Persian suzerainty.

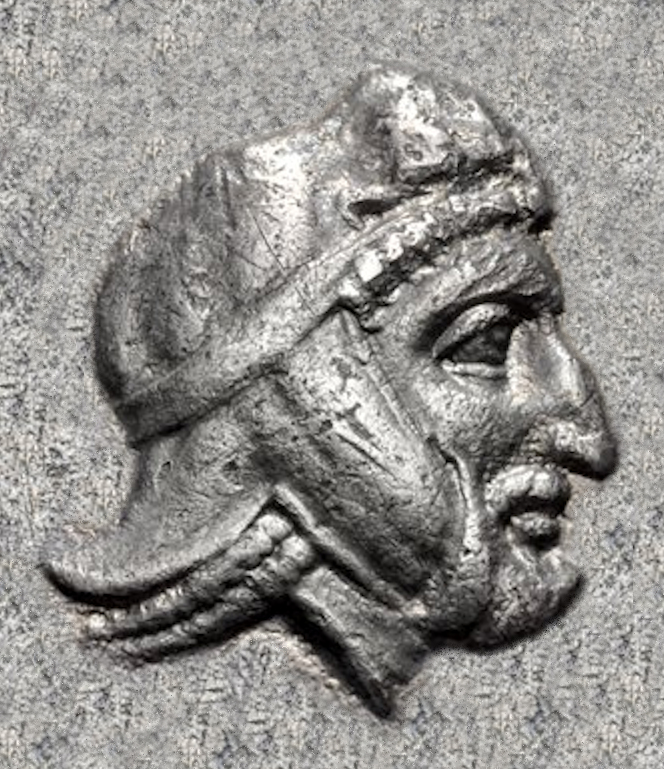
The Peace was negotiated by Satrap Tiribazos on the Achaemenid side.

A second effect of this "most disgraceful event in Greek history", as Will Durant characterized it, was the establishment of Sparta in a formalized position at the top of a Greek political system enforced by the Great King. Using their mandate to protect and enforce the peace, the Spartans proceeded to launch a number of campaigns against poleis that they perceived as political threats. Near at hand, they forced the city of Mantinea in Arcadia, to disband into its constituent villages. The largest intervention was a campaign in 382 BC to break up the federalist Chalcidian League in northeastern Greece, as violating the autonomy principle of the Great King's decree. On the way there, in 383 the Spartan commander Phoebidas, invited by a pro-Spartan faction, seized the Theban Kadmeia (the Theban acropolis) and left a Laconophile oligarchy supported by a Spartan garrison; even the pro-Spartan Xenophon could only attribute the act to madness. The principle of autonomy proved to be a flexible tool in the hand of a hegemonic power.

The King's Peace was not successful in bringing peace to Greece. Pelopidas and companions liberated Thebes in 379 by assassinating the Laconizing tyrants. After the Spartan campaign against Olynthus in 382-379 BC, general fighting resumed (Boeotian War of 378 to 371 BC) with the revived Athenian naval confederacy and continued, with intermittent attempts to restore the peace, for much of the next two decades. The idea of a Common Peace proved enduring, however, and numerous attempts would be made to establish one, with little more success than the original. By granting powers to Sparta that were sure to infuriate other states when used, the treaties sowed the seeds of their own demise, and a state of near-constant warfare continued to be the norm in Greece.

== See also ==
- List of treaties
