= Mithradates, Satrap of Cappadocia =

Satrap of Cappadocia

Satrap Mithradates was mentioned by Xenophon as satrap of Cappadocia and Lycaonia in the late 5th century BCE. He possibly was the Mithradates who accompanied the younger Cyrus. However he was not necessarily the Mithradates who caused Cyrus' death and was killed himself in its aftermath.

Pharnabazos, Satrap of Phrygia (fl. 413-373 BCE), son of Pharnaces II of Phrygia, is indicated to have shared his rule and territories with his brothers in the late 5th century BCE when Pharnabazos had recently succeeded to the position. Mithradates, Satrap of Cappadocia, might have been one of these brothers. Ariobarzanes of Cius might have also been one of these brothers.
