= Charles Anthony Vince =

English academic and author

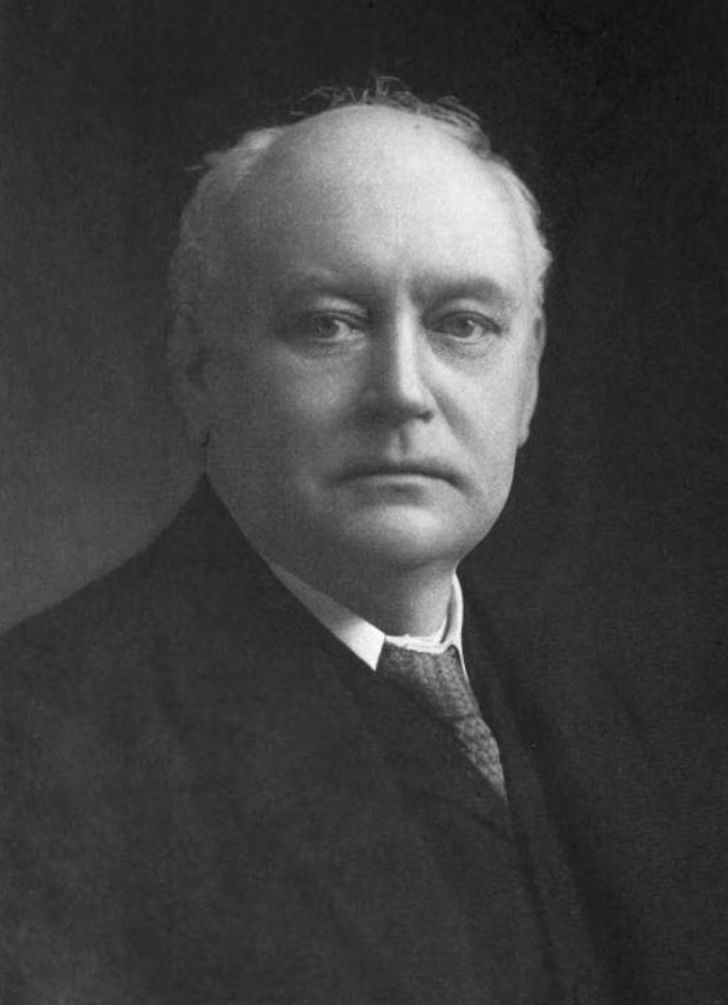
- Born: 7 December 1855; Handsworth, England
- Died: 27 January 1929 (aged 73); Birmingham, England
- Education: Christ's College, Cambridge
- Occupation: Academic
- Political party: Liberal Unionist

Charles Anthony Vince (1855–1929) was an English academic, school head and author. He was a Fellow of Christ's College, Cambridge. and Secretary of the National Liberal Union in 1892.

== Life ==
He was born on 7 December 1855 at Handsworth, the son of Charles Vince; the classical scholar James Herbert Vince was his brother. He was educated at King Edward's School, Birmingham, and matriculated at Christ's College, Cambridge in 1874. He graduated B.A. in 1878, and M.A. in 1881.

A Fellow at Christ's from 1880 to 1886, Vince became an assistant master at Repton School in 1878. He was appointed Head Master of Mill Hill School in 1886.

When the Liberal Unionists split from Gladstone's Liberal party, Vince was in charge of Joseph Chamberlain's constituency organisation. He followed Chamberlain into the Liberal Unionist camp, becoming Secretary of the Birmingham Liberal Unionist Association, and leaving Mill Hill, in 1892. He later, in 1903, chaired the Birmingham Tariff Reform Committee, a significant power base for Chamberlain. As an aide to Chamberlain, he has been described as "chief political organiser". Another view, from Byng Kenrick, was of "a literary looking gent", who was "good at slogans and pamphlets but not a great organiser".

Around 1903 Vince was a leader writer for the Birmingham Post. At this period, leading up to Chamberlain's resignation from the Cabinet, Vince was a close confidant. In 1906 he was considered a candidate to be editor of the Post, but lost out to George William Hubbard.

Vince died on 27 January 1929, in Birmingham.

== Works ==
- The New Latin Primer (1890) with John Percival Postgate
- John Bright (1898). Vince saw a close connection between John Bright's thought, and Liberal opinion in Birmingham, and had assistance from Chamberlain in this biography.
- History of the Corporation of Birmingham: With a Sketch of the Earlier Government of the Town, with John Thackray Bunce (in three volumes, the first two by Bunce, the third, to 1900, by Vince). A fourth volume, by Vince, appeared in 1923.
- Mr Chamberlain's proposals; what they mean and what we shall gain by them (1903)

Vince was also a translator into English of Demosthenes.
