= Ariobarzanes of Phrygia =

4th-century BCE Persian satrap of Hellespont Phrygia

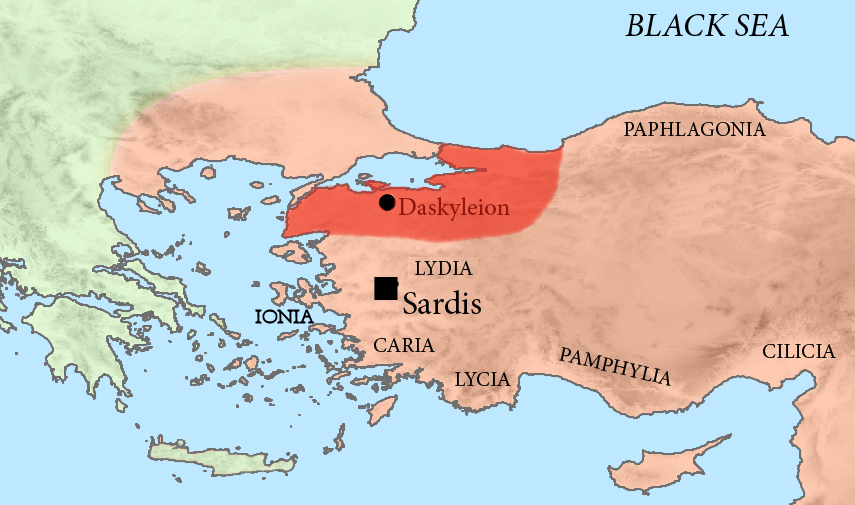
Ariobarzanes was Satrap of Hellespontine Phrygia.

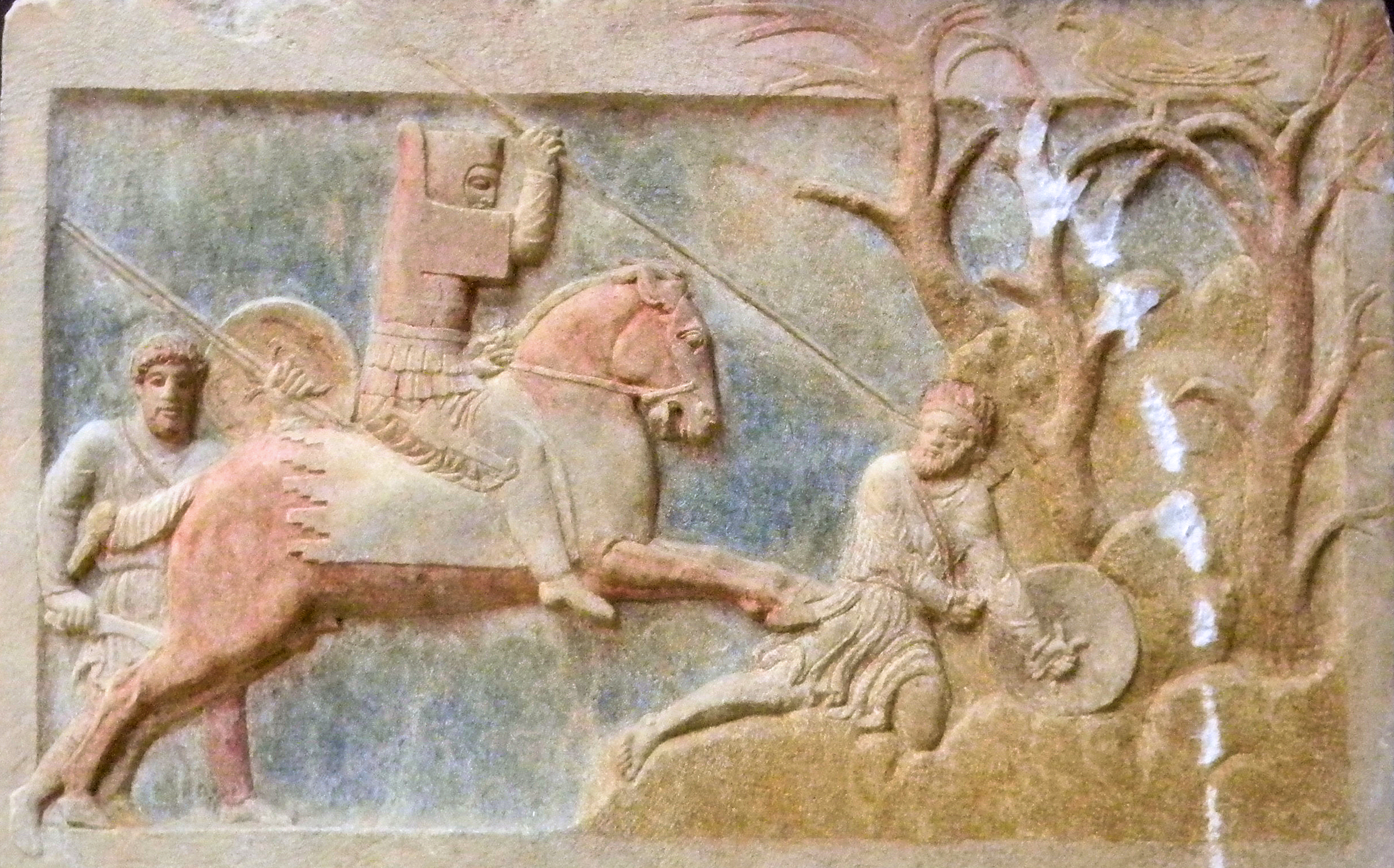
Armoured cavalry: Achaemenid Dynast of Hellespontine Phrygia attacking a Greek psiloi, Altıkulaç Sarcophagus, early 4th century BCE.

Ariobarzanes (Old Persian: *Aryābr̥zaⁿs; Ancient Greek: Ἀριοβαρζάνης Ariobarzánēs; death: crucified in c. 362 BCE), sometimes known as Ariobarzanes I of Cius, was a Persian Satrap of Phrygia and military commander, leader of an independence revolt, and the first known of the line of rulers of the Greek town of Cius who eventually were to stem the kings of Pontus in the 3rd century BCE. Ariobarzanes was apparently a cadet member of the Achaemenid dynasty, possibly son of Pharnabazus II, and part of the Pharnacid dynasty which had settled to hold Dascylium of Hellespont in the 470s BCE. Cius is located near Dascylium, and Cius seemingly was a share of family holdings for the branch of Ariobarzanes.

Ariobarzanes' one predecessor was a (kinsman) named Mithradates (possibly Mithradates, Satrap of Cappadocia). The archaeologist Walther Judeich claims that Ariobarzanes was that Mithradates' son, but Brian C. McGing refutes that specific filiation. Seemingly, no classical source itself calls them son and father, the filiation being a later reconstruction on basis of successorship.

== Rule ==
Pharnabazus, Satrap of Phrygia (fl. 413 – 373 BCE), son of Pharnaces of Phrygia, is indicated to have shared his rule and territories with his brothers in the late 5th century BCE when Pharnabazos had recently succeeded to the position. Mithradates, Satrap of Cappadocia, might have been one of such brothers. Ariobarzanes of Cius might have also been one of those brothers.

The classical source Appianus relates that Ariobarzanes was of a cadet line of the family of the Persian Great King Dareios (Darius the Great).

It is highly probable he is the same Ariobarzanes who, around 407 BCE, was the Persian envoy to the Greek city-states and cultivated the friendship of Athens and Sparta. Ariobarzanes conducted the Athenian ambassadors, in 405 BCE, to his sea-town of Cius in Mysia, after they had been detained three years by order of Cyrus the Younger.

Ariobarzanes was mentioned as under-satrap in Anatolia in late 5th century BCE. He then apparently succeeded his presumed kinsman (possibly elder brother) Pharnabazus (fl. 413 – 373 BCE) as satrap of Phrygia and Lydia, assigned by Pharnabazos himself when he departed to the Persian court to marry Apama, daughter of the Persian king. Thus Ariobarzanes became the satrap of Hellespontine Phrygia, in what is now the northwest of Turkey. Pharnabazos lived well into the 370s BCE, having obtained higher positions in the Persian monarchy than merely the Phrygian satrapship.

Ariobarzanes assisted Antalcidas in 388 BCE.

== Delphi embassy (368 BC) ==
He appears to have still held some high office in the Persian court in 368 BCE, as we find him, apparently on behalf of the king, sending an embassy led by Philiscus of Abydos to Greece in that year. Both Philiscus and Ariobarzanes, as well as three of his sons, were made citizens of Athens, a remarkable honor suggesting important services rendered to the city-state.

Ariobarzanes, who is called by Diodorus satrap of Phrygia, and by Nepos satrap of Lydia, Ionia, and Phrygia, revolted against Artaxerxes II in 362. Demosthenes speaks of Ariobarzanes and his three sons having been lately made Athenian citizens. He mentions him again in the following year and says, that the Athenians had sent Timotheus to his assistance; but that when the Athenian general saw that Ariobarzanes was in open revolt against the king, he refused to assist him.

== Great Satraps' Revolt ==
When Pharnabazos' other son, Artabazos II of Phrygia, wanted to regain the satrapy from his brother, Ariobarzanes refused. Ultimately, in about 366 BCE, Ariobarzanes joined an unsuccessful revolt of the satraps of western Anatolia against the Achamenian King Artaxerxes II (Revolt of the Satraps). Several other satraps sided with Ariobarzanes, including Mausolus of Caria (briefly), Orontes I of Armenia, Autophradates of Lydia and Datames of Cappadocia. The rebel satraps also received support from the pharaoh of Egypt, Teos, as well as from some of the Greek city states, with the Spartan king Agesilaus II coming to their assistance with a mercenary force.

Ariobarzanes withstood a siege at Adramyttium in 366 BC, from Mausolus of Caria and Autophradates of Lydia, until Agesilaus negotiated the besiegers' retreat.

Ariobarzanes was betrayed by his son Mithridates to his overlord, the Persian king, who had Ariobarzanes crucified.

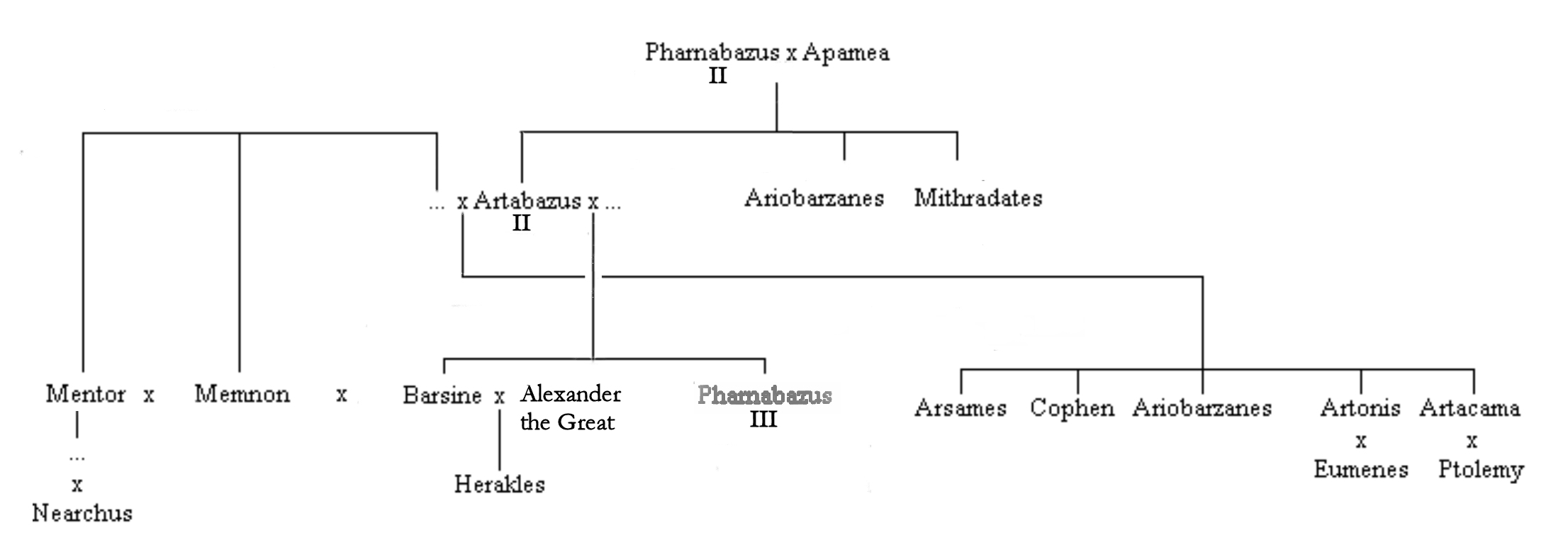
Family tree after Pharnabazus II.

== Sources ==
- Aristotle, Politics, H. Rackham (translator), Cambridge, MA - London, (1944)
- Brosius, Maria (2006). The Persians: an introduction. Taylor & Francis. ISBN 9780415320894.
- Demosthenes, Speeches, C. A. Vince & J. H. Vince (translators), Cambridge—London, (1926)
- Diodorus Siculus, Bibliotheca, C. H. Oldfather (translator), Cambridge, MA - London, (1989)
- Gershevitch, Ilya (1985). The Cambridge history of Iran: The Median and Achaemenian periods. Cambridge University Press. ISBN 9780521246996.
- McGing, Brian C. (1986) "The Kings of Pontus: Some Problems of Identity and Date,". Rheinisches Museum für Philologie, vol. 129 (1986), pp 248..259.
- Nepos, Cornetlius (1866) Lives of Eminent Commanders, John Selby Watson (translator), (1886)
- Smith, William (editor); Dictionary of Greek and Roman Biography and Mythology, "Ariobarzanes I", Boston, (1867)
- Xenophon, Cyropaedia, Cambridge, MA - London, (1979–83)
- Xenophon, Hellenica, Cambridge, MA—London, (1985–86)
