= Timotheus (general) =

4th-century BC Greek statesman and general

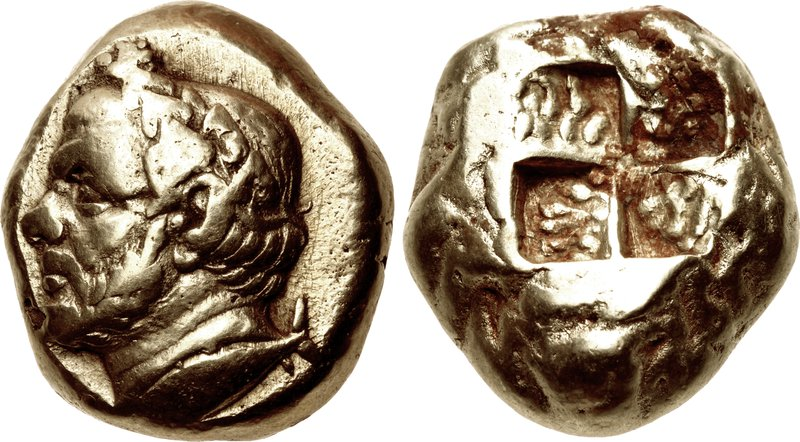
Possible portrait of Timotheos, wearing a victory wreath, on an electrum stater of Kyzikos, mid 4th century BC.

Timotheus (Greek: Τιμόθεος; died 354 BC) was a Greek statesman and general who sought to revive Athenian imperial ambitions by making Athens dominant in a Second Athenian League. He was the son of the Athenian general, Conon. Isocrates considered that Timotheus was superior to the other commanders of his time and showed all the requisites and abilities of a good general.

== Strategos ==
From 378 BC to 356 BC, Timotheus frequently held command as "strategos" in the wars between Athens (in alliance with Thebes), and Sparta. At this time, Athens' ambition was to revive the Delian League and to regain command of the sea. In 375 BC, during the Boeotian War, Timotheus was sent with a fleet to sail round Peloponnesus by way of a demonstration of Athens' power against Sparta. He persuaded Cephallenia to side with Athens and secured the friendship of the Acarnanians and Molossians. In 373 BC, Timotheus was appointed to the command of a fleet for the relief of Corcyra, then beleaguered by the Spartans, but his ships were not fully manned, and to increase their manpower he cruised in the Aegean. The delay upset the Athenians, who brought him to trial; but, thanks to the intervention of his allies – Jason, tyrant of Pherae, and Alcetas I of Epirus, King of the Molossians, both of whom went to Athens to plead his cause he was acquitted. In way of support, Amyntas, King of Macedon, sent timber to Timeotheus' house in the Piraeus. Upon his acquittal, he went to sea with his fleet and captured Corcyra and then defeated the Spartans at sea off Alyzia (Acarnania). However, with little money to his name—for he had used his own funds to build up the Athenian fleet—he left Athens and took service with the king of Persia as a mercenary.

== Asia Minor ==
Having returned to Athens, in 366 BC he was sent to support Ariobarzanes, satrap of Phrygia. But, finding that the satrap was in open rebellion against Persia (Revolt of the Satraps), Timotheus, in line with his instructions, abstained from helping him and rather used his army against Samos, then occupied by a Persian garrison, and took it after a ten months' siege (366 BC-365 BC). He then took Sestus, Crithote, Torone, Potidaea, Methone, Pydna and many other cities; but two attempts to capture Amphipolis failed.

== Court case ==
An action was brought against him by Apollodorus, the son of the banker Pasion, for the return of money lent by his father. The speech for the plaintiff is still extant, and is attributed to Demosthenes (see also Pseudo-Demosthenes). It is interesting as it describes the manner in which Timotheus had exhausted the large fortune inherited from his father and the straits to which he was reduced by his sacrifices in the public cause.

== Social War ==
In 358 BC or 357 BC, an Athenian force, in response to a spirited appeal from Timotheus, crossed over to Euboea and expelled the Thebans in three days. In the course of the Social War Timotheus was dispatched with Iphicrates, Menestheus, son of Iphicrates, and Chares to put down the revolt. The hostile fleets sighted each other in the Hellespont; but a gale was blowing, and Iphicrates and Timotheus decided not to engage. Chares, disregarding the advice of his colleagues, lost many ships.

== Final years ==
In his dispatches after the battle, Chares complained so bitterly about Iphicrates and Timotheus that the Athenians put them on their trial. The accusers were Chares and Aristophon. Iphicrates, who had fewer enemies than Timotheus, was acquitted; but Timotheus, who had always been disliked for his perceived arrogance, was condemned to pay a very heavy fine. Being unable to pay, he withdrew to Chalcis, where he died soon afterwards. The Athenians later showed their sorrow over the treatment of Timotheus by forgiving the greater part of the fine that had passed onto his son Conon to pay. Timotheus was buried in the Ceramicus and statues were erected to his memory in the Agora and the Acropolis.

== Reputation ==
Timotheus inspired much jealousy among his rivals, his reputation somewhat tarnished by the record of his final years. Aelian sums up much of the negative perception of Timotheus' generalship: "Note that the Athenian general Timotheus was reckoned to be fortunate. People said fortune was responsible, and Timotheus had no part in it. They ridiculed him on the stage, and painters portrayed him asleep, with Tyche (Fortune) hovering above his head and pulling the cities into her net." This commentary is balanced by the credible picture (presented by Isocrates) of a skilled and cautious general, magnanimous victor and low-key diplomat.

== Bibliography ==
- See Life by Cornelius Nepos; Diodorus Siculus xv., xvi.; Isocrates, De permutatione; Pseudo-Demosthenes, Adversus Timotheum; C. Rehdantz, Vitae Iphicratis, Chabriae, Timothei (1845); and especially Holm, History of Greece (English translation, Volume III.).
- Robinson, E. S. G.; Price, M. J. (1967). "An emergency coinage of Timotheos". Numismatic Chronicle. 7th Series. 7: 1–6.
- Burich, Nancy Jane (1994). Timotheus, son of Conon, prostates of the Second Athenian Confederacy (PhD). University of Kansas.
- Heskel, Julia (2016). The North Aegean Wars, 371-360 B.C. Stuttgart: Franz Steiner Verlag. ISBN 978-3-515-11475-2.
- Sheedy, K. A. (2015). "The Emergency Coinage of Timotheus (364–362 BC)". In Wartenberg, U.; Amandry, M. (eds.). ΚΑΙΡΟΣ: Contributions to Numismatics in Honor of Basil Demetriadi. New York. pp. 203–223.
- Sheedy, K.A.; Gore, D.; Ponting, M. (2015). "The Bronze Issues of the Athenian General Timotheus: Evaluating the Evidence of Polyaenus's Stratagemata". American Journal of Numismatics. 27: 1–20.
- Scafuro, Adele S.; Gagarin, Michael (2011). Demosthenes, speeches 39/49 (1st ed.). Austin: University of Texas Press. ISBN 9780292785908.
