= Henry Graham Dakyns =

British translator (1838–1911)

Henry Graham Dakyns, often H. G. Dakyns (1838–1911), was a British translator of Ancient Greek, best known for his translations of Xenophon: the Cyropaedia and Hellenica, The Economist, Hiero and On Horsemanship.

== Life ==
Henry Graham Dakyns was born on Saint Vincent in the West Indies, the second son of Thomas Henry Dakyns of Rugby, Warwickshire. His mother Harriet Dasent was the sister of George Webbe Dasent, translator of the Icelandic sagas. He was educated at Rugby School and Trinity College, Cambridge, where he graduated BA in 1860.

Dakyns was a tutor for Lord Alfred Tennyson's children, and subsequently House Master and Assistant Master at Clifton College from 1862 to 1889. Though he never played himself, he started the Rugby Football Club at Clifton College.

Graham had numerous correspondences with Tennyson and his wife, Henry Sidgwick, John Addington Symonds and T.E. Brown and other nineteenth century literary figures.

== Translations ==
- Agesilaus, Project Gutenberg
- Anabasis, Project Gutenberg
- The Cavalry General
- Cyropaedia, Gutenberg Press
- The Economist, Gutenberg Press
- Hellenica, Gutenberg Press
- Hiero by Xenophon, Gutenberg Press
- The Memorabilia, Project Gutenberg
- On Horsemanship by Xenophon, Gutenberg Press
- On Revenues, Project Gutenberg
- The Polity of the Athenians and the Lacedaemonians, Project Gutenberg
- The Sportsman, Project Gutenberg
- The Symposium, Project Gutenberg

== Works on Dakyns ==
- Letters to a Tutor: The Tennyson Family Letters to Henry Graham Dakyns by Robert Peters. Scarecrow Press, 1989
