= Ranko Matasović =

Croatian linguist (born 1968)

- Born: 14 May 1968 (age 57); Zagreb, SFR Yugoslavia (now Zagreb, Croatia)
- Occupations: linguist, Indo-Europeanist, Celticist
- Notable work: Etymological Dictionary of Proto-Celtic (2009)

Ranko Matasović (Croatian pronunciation: [râːŋko matǎːsoʋitɕ]; born 14 May 1968) is a Croatian linguist, Indo-Europeanist, and Celticist.

== Biography ==
Matasović was born and raised in Zagreb, where he attended primary and secondary school. In the Faculty of philosophy at the University of Zagreb, he graduated in linguistics and philosophy, receiving an M.A. in linguistics in 1992 and a Ph.D. in 1995 under the supervision of Radoslav Katičić with the thesis A Theory of Textual Reconstruction in Indo-European Linguistics. He has received research fellowships at the University of Vienna (1993) and the University of Oxford (1995), a post-doctoral Fulbright Fellowship at the University of Wisconsin during 1997/1998 (with Andrew Sihler as an advisor), and also an Alexander von Humboldt Foundation fellowship at the University of Bonn in 2002/2003.

He currently holds a chair in the Department of Linguistics in the Faculty of Philosophy in Zagreb, where he teaches courses on comparative Indo-European grammar, Celtic studies, and language typology. His research interests include comparative Indo-European grammar (especially of Celtic and Balto-Slavic languages), language typology and syntax, and Latin, Celtic, and Hittite philology. He has contributed to the Indo-European Etymological Dictionary project organized by Leiden University with his Etymological Dictionary of Proto-Celtic. He has also published works on Armenian and Albanian, including the Arbanasi speech of the Albanian diaspora near Zadar.

In 2002, he received an award from the Croatian Academy of Sciences and Arts for a lasting contribution to philology. In 2006, he became an associate member of the same institution and was promoted into a full member in 2012.

In 2022, he was elected a member of the Academia Europaea.

== Works ==
He has published more than 100 papers in Croatian and foreign-language journals and translated various works from Latin, Ancient Greek, Lithuanian, Hittite, Old and modern Irish, Welsh, and English.

=== Linguistics ===
- A Theory of Textual Reconstruction in Indo-European Linguistics (Frankfurt a/M & New York: Peter Lang, 1996) ISBN 3-631-49751-2
- Kratka poredbenopovijesna gramatika latinskoga jezika [A Short Comparative-Historical Grammar of Latin] (Zagreb: Matica hrvatska, ¹1997, ²2010) ISBN 953-150-105-X, ISBN 978-953-150-901-5
- Kultura i književnost Hetita [Hittite Culture and Literature] (Zagreb; Matica hrvatska, 2000) ISBN 953-15-0548-9
- Uvod u poredbenu lingvistiku [An Introduction to Comparative Linguistics] (Zagreb: Matica hrvatska, 2001) ISBN 953-150-612-4
- Hrvatski enciklopedijski rječnik [Encyclopedic Dictionary of Croatian], co-edited with Ljiljana Jojić, Vladimir Anić, et al. (Zagreb: Novi Liber, ¹2002, ²2004–2005) ISBN 953-6045-21-4
- Gender in Indo-European (Heidelberg: Carl Winter, 2004) ISBN 3-8253-1666-1
- Jezična raznolikost svijeta [Linguistic Diversity of the World] (Zagreb: Algoritam, ¹2005, ²2011) ISBN 953-220-355-9, ISBN 978-953-220-355-4
- Poredbenopovijesna gramatika hrvatskoga jezika [A Comparative-Historical Grammar of Croatian] (Zagreb: Matica hrvatska, 2008.) ISBN 978-953-150-840-7
- Etymological Dictionary of Proto-Celtic (Leiden & Boston: Brill, 2009) ISBN 978-90-04-17336-1
  - “Addenda et corrigenda to Ranko Matasović’s Etymological Dictionary of Proto-Celtic (Brill, Leiden 2009)” (Zagreb, 2011)
- A Reader in Comparative Indo-European Religion (Zagreb: University of Zagreb, 2010)
- Etimološki rječnik hrvatskoga jezika: 1. svezak (A-Nj), 2. svezak (O-Ž) [Etymological Dictionary of Croatian Language], edited, co-authored with Tijmen Pronk, Dubravka Ivšić, Dunja Brozović Rončević (Zagreb: Institut za hrvatski jezik i jezikoslovlje, 2016–2021) ISBN 978-953-7967-51-2, ISBN 978-953-7967-85-7
- Slavic Nominal Word-Formation: Proto-Indo-European Origins and Historical Development (Heidelberg: Carl Winter, 2014) ISBN 978-3-8253-6335-2
- Lingvistička povijest Europe [Linguistic History of Europe] (Zagreb: Matica hrvatska, 2016) ISBN 9789533410616
- An Areal Typology of Agreement Systems (Cambridge: Cambridge University Press, 2018) ISBN 978-1-108-42097-6

=== Translations ===
- Harfa sa sjevera. Iz irske književnosti (Zagreb: Antibarbarus, 1995) ISBN 953-6160-25-0
- Koje je vrijeme? Suvremena irska pripovijetka (Zagreb: Matica hrvatska, 1997) ISBN 953-6014-96-3
- Kamen kraljeva. Srednjovjekovne irske sage (Zagreb: Ex Libris, 2004) ISBN 953-6310-35-X
- Sveti Patrik. Djela / Opera (Confessio sancti Patricii episcopi; Epistole ad milites Corotici) (Zagreb: Antibarbarus, 2004) ISBN 953-6160-91-9
- Četiri grane Mabinogija (Zagreb: ArTresor, 2005) ISBN 953-6522-52-7
- J. P. Mallory. Indoeuropljani: Zagonetka njihova podrijetla - jezik, arheologija, mit (Zagreb: Školska knjiga, 2006) ISBN 953061568X
- Narti: Mitovi i legende s Kavkaza (Zagreb: Matica hrvatska, 2010) ISBN 978-953-150-898-8
- Edward Sapir. Jezik: Uvod u istraživanje govora (Zagreb: Institut za hrvatski jezik i jezikoslovlje) ISBN 978-953-6637-60-7
- Ksenofont. O konjaničkom umijeću; O zapovjedniku konjice, with Maja Rupnik-Matasović (Zagreb: Latina et Graeca, 2018) ISBN 978-953-6565-29-0
- Plaut. Stiho (Zagreb: Latina et Graeca, 2022), with Maja Rupnik-Matasović ISBN 9789536565436
- Dvadeset pjesama o ljubavi i smrti (i kratkih priča o njima) (Zagreb: Matica hrvatska, 2023) ISBN 978-953-341-250-4
- Plaut. Prostak (Zagreb: Latina et Graeca, 2023), with Maja Rupnik-Matasović ISBN 978-953-656-544-3

=== Fiction ===
- Neprobuđeni. Roman (Zagreb: Ibis grafika, 2022) ISBN 978-953-363-099-1
