= Federico Zuolo =

Italian philosopher (born 1979)

- Born: 10 October 1979 (age 46)
- Education: University of Pavia
- Occupation: Philosopher
- Employer: University of Genoa

Federico Zuolo (born 10 October 1979) is an Italian philosopher whose work concerns political philosophy and applied ethics. He is an associate professor in the Department of Classics, Philosophy and History at the University of Genoa.

== Education and career ==
Zuolo was educated at the University of Pavia from 1998 to 2006, where he was supervised by Salvatore Veca, Fiorella de Michelis, Mario Vegetti, and Franco Trabattoni. He completed theses on Spinoza and Plato. After a brief spell at the University of Trento, he returned to Pavia in 2008, where he remained until 2015. He contributed to European Commission-funded research on a pluralistic European ethos at Trento (2007-2008); conducted MIUR-funded research on toleration at Pavia (2009-2012); managed European Consortium-funded research on toleration and respect across a range of institutions while based at Pavia (2010-11); and conducted MIUR-funded research on food politics and multiculturalism at Pavia (2012-15). He qualified as an Associate Professor in Political Philosophy in 2014, and held a senior von Humboldt fellowship researching politics and animals, working with Bernd Ladwig at the Free University of Berlin and Peter Niesen at the University of Hamburg (2015-17). He started at Genoa in 2017.

Zuolo's first book was Platone e l’efficacia (Plato and Efficiency), which was published by Academia Verlag in 2009. He published an Italian translation of Xenophon's Hiero with Carocci Editore in 2012, and co-edited, with Gideon Calder and Magali Bessone, the 2014 Routledge collection How Groups Matter. In 2018, with il Mulino, he published Etica e animali (Animals and Ethics), and, in 2020, he published Animals, Political Liberalism and Public Reason with Palgrave Macmillan. In 2024, he published Disobbedire: Se, come, quando (Disobey: If, how, when) with Editori Laterza, and in 2026, he published Il quotidiano è politico: L'attivismo individuale oggi (The Everyday is Political: Individual Activism Today) with Giulio Einaudi Editore.

== Selected publications ==
- Platone e l’efficacia [Plato and Efficiency] (Academia Verlag, 2009)
- Hiero (Italian translation) (Carocci Editore, 2012)
- Etica e animali [Animals and Ethics] (il Mulino, 2018)
- Animals, Political Liberalism and Public Reason (Palgrave Macmillan, 2020)
- Disobbedire: Se, come, quando [Disobey: If, How, When] (Editori Laterza, 2024)
- Il quotidiano è politico: L'attivismo individuale oggi [The Quotidian is Political: Individual Activism Today] (Giulio Einaudi Editore, 2026)
