= Simon of Athens =

- Born: Simon
- Known for: fragments on horsemanship

Simon of Athens was an Athenian writer on horses and horsemanship of the fifth century BC. He is the earliest known ancient Greek writer on the subject; Pliny described him as primus de equitatu scripsit, "the first to have written on riding". His writings are quoted by Xenophon.

== Life ==
It is not known when Simon lived. However, it cannot have been much before 460 BC, as he is known to have criticised a work of the Athenian painter Micon, who lived at about that time. Simon is the earliest writer of ancient Greece known to have written on horses and horsemanship, and was described by Pliny as primus de equitatu scripsit, "the first to have written on riding".

According to Xenophon, Simon dedicated a bronze statue of a horse, on a plinth decorated with reliefs of his deeds, in the Eleusinion in the Agora of Athens.

== Works ==
Simon's writings are quoted by Xenophon, who refers to him both in the Hipparchikós (Ἱππαρχικός) and in Perì hippikēs (Περὶ ἱππικῆς, "on horsemanship"). A fragment attributed to him is contained in the Byzantine Hippiatrica, an assemblage of Greek texts on horse care and horse medicine dating from the fifth or sixth century AD; it deals with the characteristics of a good horse, and is entitled περί ἰδέας ἱππικῆς, or roughly "on the ideal horse". Another fragment is included in the Onomasticon of Julius Pollux.

His works were believed otherwise lost until, in 1853, the French philologist Charles Victor Daremberg discovered a single chapter in the library of Emmanuel College, Cambridge. All the extant fragments of Simon's writings were published by Franz Rühl in 1912.

Simon is mentioned three times in the Hippiatrica: there are two passing mentions of him as an authority like Xenophon, and an account of his criticism of Micon's painting. The attribution to him in the Suda, a compendious Byzantine lexicon, of a work on horse medicine is probably an error, as the passage attributed to him – on the recognition of veins – is in fact taken from the Digesta artis mulomedicinae of Publius Flavius Vegetius Renatus. Elsewhere in the Suda Simon's work is referred to as a ίπποσκοπικόν βιβλίον θαυμάσιον, or roughly "wonderful book of horse examination".
