= Cynegeticus =

Ancient Greek treatise by Xenophon

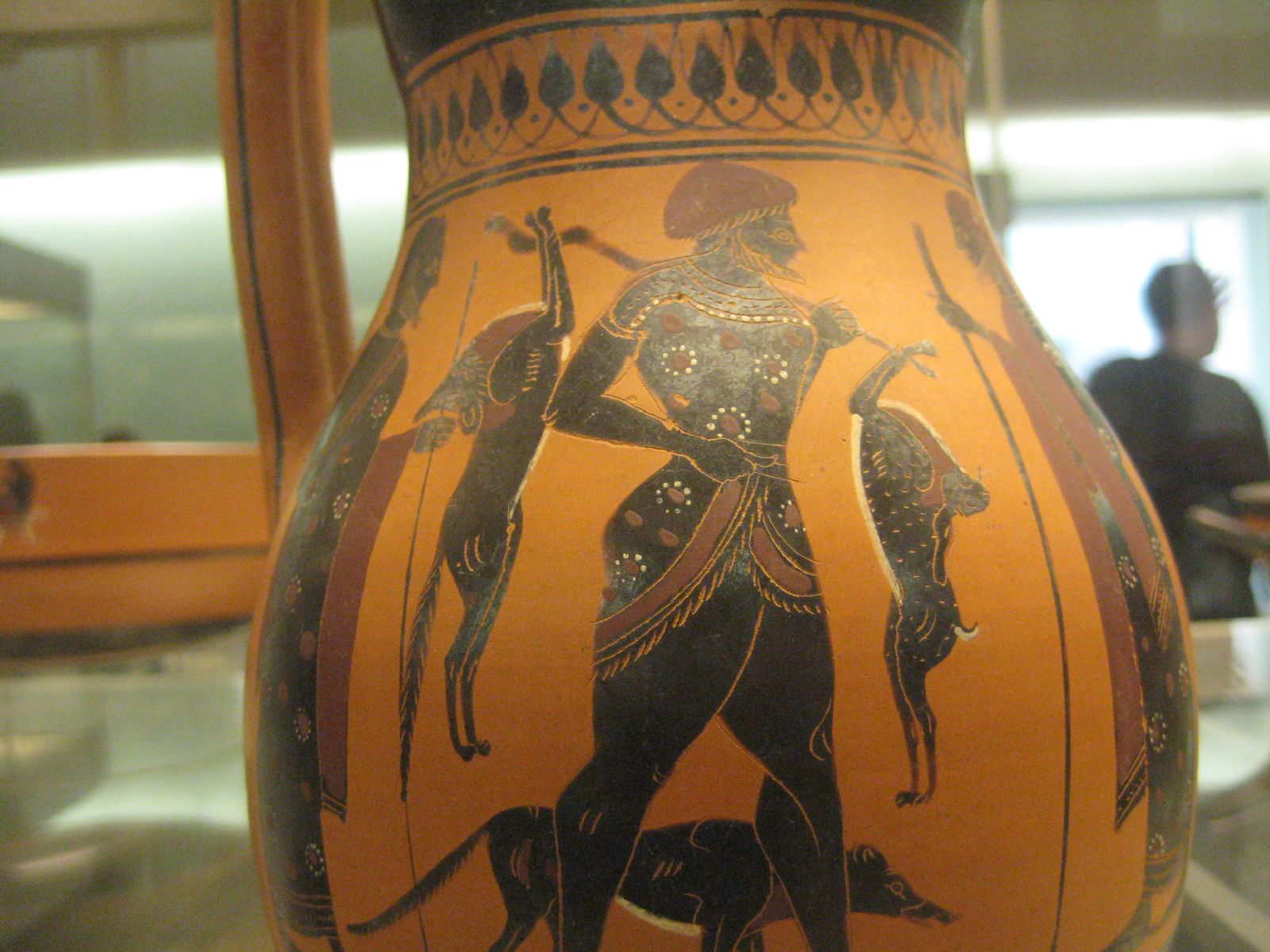
Cynegeticus image

Cynegeticus (Ancient Greek: Κυνηγετικός, Kynegetikos "related to hunting" from κυνηγέω "I hunt"), is a treatise by the ancient Greek philosopher and military leader Xenophon, usually translated as "On Hunting" or "Hunting with Dogs."

It is one of the four works by Xenophon on arts or skills (each ends with -ikos/-icus). The other three are: Hipparchicus ("The Skilled Cavalry Commander") Peri Hippikes ("On Horsemanship"), Oeconomicus ("On Estate Management").

== Synopsis ==
=== Chapter 1 ===
Xenophon begins discussing the importance of hunting and how the gods Apollo and Artemis bestowed game and hounds upon Chiron the gentle centaur who used hunting to teach twenty-one heroes. The heroes mentioned are: Cephalus, Asclepius, Meilanion, Nestor, Amphiaraus, Peleus, Telamon, Meleager, Theseus, Hippolytus, Palamedes, Odysseus, Menestheus, Diomedes, Castor, Polydeuces, Machaon, Podaleirius, Antilochus, Aeneas, and Achilles. Xenophon goes on to describe the excellence of each individual "hero," although many of his reasons are rather awkward upon other instances of them in literature. Hunting, Xenophon claims in the conclusion to the chapter, "are the means by which men become good in war and in all things out of which must come excellence in thought and word and deed" (I.18, E. C. Marchant translation).

=== Chapter 2 ===
Xenophon attends to the young man who is to hunt and his attire with explanation to each item's purpose, and also the net-keeper who is to assist him, including a brief detail of the net required.

=== Chapter 3 ===
Xenophon writes concerning the two types of hounds to be used: the Castorian and the Vulpine. He gives extremely detailed descriptions of the temperament of various dogs. Some of the defects in the hounds are due to nature, but they can also be due to bad training.

=== Chapter 4 ===
The physical characteristics of the superior hound are described, as well as the initial training needed in various seasons for the proper hunting of hares.

=== Chapter 5 ===
The seasons and the difficulties particular to each of them in the pursuit of hares are presented. Also the physical characteristics and the habits of the hare are analyzed at length.

=== Chapter 6 ===
Xenophon begins with means of restraining hounds before they are off to hunt, but quickly moves into the early morning preparations for the hunt. Xenophon also discusses how the net-keeper is to prepare himself. Once the hunt has begun and the hunting party has reached a place to find a hare they are to offer a "vow to Apollo and Artemis the Huntress" that they will share their prize with them. It is only now that the hound is to be let loose to find the trail of the hare, which it will pursue when it is found. Once the hunt has begun the huntsman should verbally praise the hound. If the hare is caught in the first attempt the hounds should be brought back in and they should search for another. Otherwise the pursuit has really begun, and Xenophon really makes a game of it with constant verbal remarks towards the hounds. Once the dogs are tired from hunting the huntsman should search on his own.

=== Chapter 7 ===
In this chapter, Xenophon provides a list of suitable names for hunting dogs. These names are short and reflect virtues of alacrity and steadfastness.

Ancient Greek Name	Transliteration	English Translation
Ψυχή	Psychḗ	Soul
Θυμός	Thymós	Spirit
Πόρπαξ	Pórpax	Shield
Στύραξ	Stýrax	Resin (or a type of tree)
Λογχή	Lonkhḗ	Lance
Λόχος	Lókhos	Ambush
Φρουρά	Phrurá	Guard
Φύλαξ	Phýlax	Guardian
Τάξις	Táxis	Order
Ξίφων	Xíphōn	Dirk
Φόναξ	Phónax	Killer
Φλέγων	Phlégōn	Blazing
Ἀλκή	Alkḗ	Might
Τεύχων	Téuchōn	Armor
Ὑλεύς	Hyléus	Ranger
Μήδας	Médas	Ruler
Πόρθων	Pórthōn	Ravager
Σπέρχων	Spérkhōn	Eager
Ὀργή	Orgḗ	Rage
Βρέμων	Brémōn	Roaring
Ὕβρις	Hýbris	Pride
Θάλλων	Thállōn	Blooming
Ῥώμη	Rhṓmē	Rome
Ἀνθεύς	Anthéus	Flowery
Ἥβα	Hḗba	Youth
Γηθεύς	Gēthéus	Joyful
Χαρά	Khará	Joy
Λεύσων	Léusōn	Watcher
Αὐγώ	Augṓ	Radiant
Πολεύς	Poléus	Abundant
Βία	Bía	Force
Στίχων	Stíkhōn	Line
Σπουδή	Spudḗ	Zeal
Βρύας	Brýas	To Swell
Οἰνάς	Oinás	Wine
Στέρρος	Stérros	Sturdy
Κραύγη	Cráugē	Shout
Καίνων	Káinōn	Fresh
Τύρβας	Týrbas	Uproar
Σθένων	Sthénōn	Might
Αἰθήρ	Aithḗr	Sky
Ἀκτίς	Aktís	Beam
Αἰχμή	Aikhmḗ	Edge
Νόης	Nóēs	Mind
Γνώμη	Gnṓmē	Judgment
Στίβōν	Stíbon	Course
Ὁρμή	Hormḗ	Charge

Xenophon next explains how to have the puppies follow the hounds while hunting and eventually let them catch the hare and let them have her. They are to be fed when they are near the nets, so if they are lost they will return to be fed. Eventually the hounds will regard the hare as enemy and the master will feed them himself when this has been accomplished.

=== Chapter 8 ===
Describes hunting the hare in the snow.

=== Chapter 9 ===
Xenophon ends the discussion of hunting hares and begins discussing how to hunt fawns, deer, and calves. He also now suggests using the Indian hound because they are larger, quicker, and more courageous. The first mention of traps is discussed when hunting deer, in particular Xenophon mentions the caltrop and discusses a foot-gin at length.

=== Chapter 10 ===
The game now gets larger and more difficult, requiring many traps including nets, javelins, spears, and caltrops as well as different species of hounds including Indian, Cretan, Locrian, and Laconian. The net now requires fifteen strand ropes rather than the nine strands used for the hares. The boar requires a great deal more effort, and it will become not only a pursuit but a fight. Only now does Xenophon discuss the deaths of many hounds and the risks involved for the hunter.

=== Chapter 11 ===
Xenophon moves outside of Greece to other countries discussing how they hunt lions, leopards, lynxes, panthers, bears, and other large beasts. The game are frequently poisoned through food or caught with the use of goat as a lure. This is no longer a pursuit, but merely capture.

=== Chapter 12 ===
Xenophon ends the discussion on the practical side of hunting and explains the benefits of hunting. First he discusses the health benefits of improved sight and hearing, longevity, and lastly that it is the best training for war.

Once he mentions the military he goes on to discuss the benefits of hunting as war training such as the recovery of fellow troops in a difficult area. Xenophon writes, "For men who are sound in body and mind may always stand on the threshold of success" (XII.5). Hunting also "makes men sober and upright … because they are trained in the school of truth" (XII.7). These men can do whatever honorable employment they desire and make good soldiers and generals because they desire virtue.

Xenophon goes on to defend hunting from those who think it causes them to avoid domestic affairs, however he believes that they will instead protect and assist their fellow citizens. He writes, "Those then, who have given themselves up to continual toil and learning hold for their own portion laborious lessons and exercises, but they hold safety for the cities" (XII.15). Toil is required to discover what is good, without such labor they cannot become pious or wise.

Xenophon again mentions Chiron, who he says began teaching lessons in virtue with hunting and it is due to this education that they became honored men. "That all desire Virtue is obvious," explains Xenophon, "but because they must toil if they are to gain her, the many fall away." He then turns to the unseen (feminine) form of Virtue who sees all men and honors those who are good to her, "but casts out the bad".

=== Chapter 13 ===
Xenophon switches to the discussion of the sophists who teach merely words but not thoughts or deed. (In his Memorabilia he stresses how his teacher Socrates turned men to virtue and then to action.) He complains of the sophists' flourished language without any stress upon bringing their students to virtue. He explains his own objective: "It may well be that I fail to express myself in subtle language, 388 nor do I pretend to aim at subtlety; what I do aim at is to express rightly-conceived thoughts such as may serve the need of those who have been nobly disciplined in virtue; for it is not words and names that give instruction, but thoughts and sentiments worthy the name" (XIII.5). He then writes further about his own writing.

He eventually concludes the work stressing that hunting makes men pious and pleases the gods, "For all men who have loved hunting have been good: and not men only, but those women also to whom the goddess Artemis has given this blessing, Atalanta and Procris and others like them".

== Cynegeticon ==
There is also a much later prose work of the same name by Arrian, written as a supplement to Xenophon's, specifically to describe hunting with sighthounds Arrian On Coursing, and Latin poems on various aspects of hunting predominantly with dogs by Grattius and Nemesianus.

This genre of literature, generally about breeding and the care and use of dogs and horses, is known as Cynegeticon or Cynegetica.

== See also ==
- Actaeon

== Translations ==
- William Blane and William Somerville. Cynegetica; Or, Essays on Sporting: Consisting of Observations on Hare Hunting &c. &c., To Which Is Added, The Chase: a Poem. London: Printed for J. Stockdale, 1788. Extracts: Xenophon, §5-7; Arrian §1-22. Google Books
- William Dansey. Arrian on Coursing. The Cynegeticus of the Younger Xenophon, Translated from the Greek, with Classical and Practical Annotations, and a Brief Sketch of the Life and Writings of the Author. To Which Is Added an Appendix, Containing Some Account of the Canes Venatici of Classical Antiquity. London: J. Bohn, 1831. archive link
- E. C. Marchant. Xenophon. Scripta Minora. Loeb Classical Library. Cambridge, Mass., Harvard University Press. 1925. Xenophon only, with other works. Greek and English. Perseus link
- Denison Bingham Hull. Hounds and Hunting in Ancient Greece. Chicago: University of Chicago Press, 1964. Contains both Xenophon and Arrian.
- A. A. Phillips and Malcolm M. Willcock. Xenophon & Arrian, On hunting (Kynēgetikos). Warminster, Eng: Aris & Phillips, 1999. Greek and English.
