= Hippiatrica =

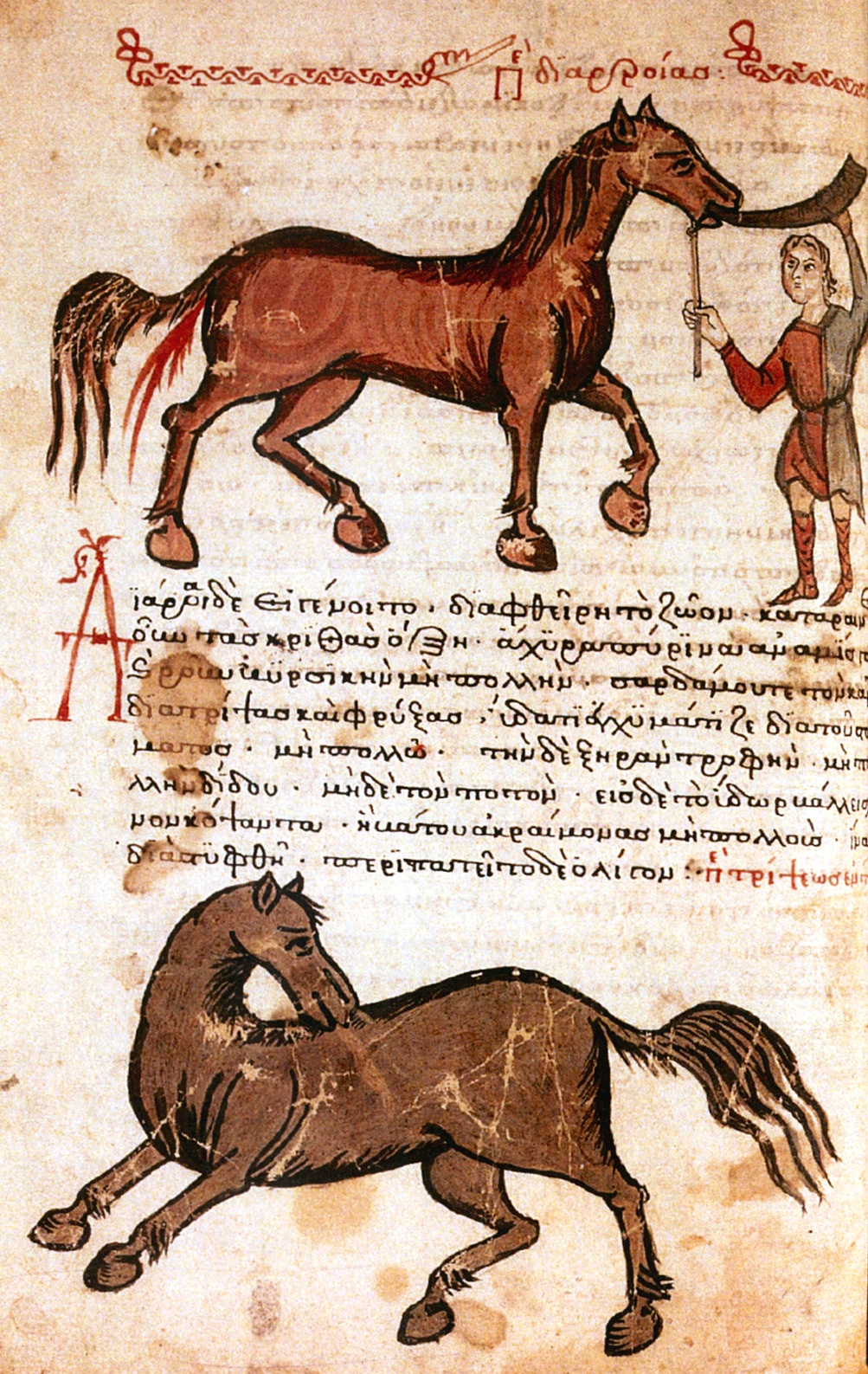
- Folio from the Hippiatrica with written and illustrated instructions on drenching a horse to induce diarrhea. 14th century edition.
- Discipline: Veterinary medicine
- Language: Medieval Greek

Publication details
- History: 10th–16th centuries

Standard abbreviations
- ISO 4: Hippiatrica

The Hippiatrica (Greek: Ἱππιατρικά) is a Byzantine compilation of ancient Greek texts, mainly excerpts, dedicated to the care and healing of the horse. The texts were probably compiled in the fifth or sixth century AD by an unknown editor. Currently, the compilation is preserved in five recensions in 22 manuscripts (containing 25 copies) ranging in date from the 10th to the 16th centuries AD.

== Contents ==
Seven texts from Late Antiquity constitute the main sources of the Hippiatrica: the veterinary manuals of Apsyrtus, Eumelus (a veterinary practitioner in Thebes, Greece) Hierocles, Hippocrates, and Theomnestus, as well as the work of Pelagonius (originally a Latin text translated into Greek), and the chapter on horses from the agricultural compilation of Anatolius. Although the aforementioned authors allude to their classical Greek veterinary predecessors (i.e. Xenophon and Simon of Athens), the roots of their tradition mainly lie in Hellenistic agricultural literature derived from Mago of Carthage. In the 10th century AD, two more sources from Late Antiquity were added to the Hippiatrica: a work by Tiberius and an anonymous set of Prognoses and Remedies (Greek: Προγνώσεις καὶ ἰάσεις). Content-wise, the sources in the Hippiatrica provide no systematic exposition of veterinary art and emphasize practical treatment rather than on aetiology or medical theory. However, the compilation contains a wide variety of literary forms and styles: proverbs, poetry, incantations, letters, instructions, prooimia, medical definitions, recipes, and reminiscences. In the entire Hippiatrica, the name of Cheiron, the Greek centaur associated with healing and linked with veterinary medicine, appears twice (as a deity) in the form of a rhetorical invocation and in the form of a spell; a remedy called a cheironeion (χειρώνειον) is named after the mythological figure.
