= Alfred von Gutschmid =

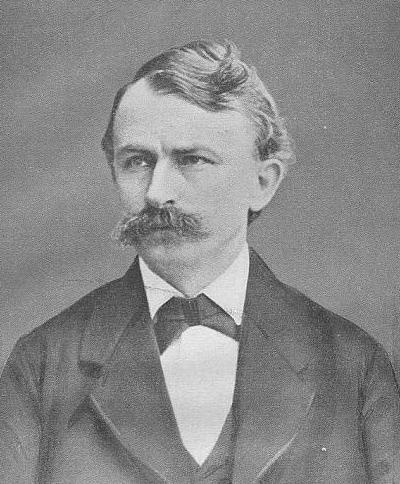
Alfred von Gutschmid

Hermann Alfred Freiherr (Baron) von Gutschmid (1 July 1835 – 2 March 1887), German historian and Orientalist, was born at Loschwitz near Dresden.

He devoted himself to the study of Eastern language and history in its pre-Greek and Hellenistic periods, contributed largely to the literature of the subject. After holding chairs at Kiel (1866), Königsberg (1873), and Jena (1876), he was finally appointed professor of history at Tübingen, where he remained until his death in that city.

== Works ==
- Über die Fragmente des Pompeius Trogus (supplementary volume of Jahrbücher für classische Philologie, 1857).
- Die makedonische Anagraphe (1864).
- Beiträge zur Geschichte des alten Orients (Leipzig, 1858).
- Neue Beiträge zur Geschichte des alten Orients., vol. i., Die Assyriologie in Deutschland (Leipzig, 1876).
- Die Glaubwürdigkeit der armenischen Geschichte des Moses von Khoren (1877).
- Untersuchungen über die syrische Epitome des eusebischen Canones (1886).
- Untersuchungen über die Geschichte des Königreichs Osraëne (1887).
- Geschichte Irans und seiner Nachbarländer von Alexander dem Großen bis zum Untergang der Arsaciden (History of Iran and its neighboring countries of Alexander the Great to the fall of the Arsacidae); published posthumously by Theodor Nöldeke (1888).

He wrote on Persia and Phoenicia in the 9th edition of the Encyclopædia Britannica. A collection of minor works entitled Kleine Schriften was published by Franz Rühl at Leipzig (1889–1894, 5 vols.), with complete list of his writings. See article by Rühl in Allgemeine deutsche Biographie, xlix. (1904).

== See also ==
- Victor Gardthausen – one of his students
