= Pelagonius =

Pelagonius (4th century AD) was an influential Latin writer on veterinary medicine, especially on horses. He is one of the many authors whose work was compiled and preserved in the Hippiatrica. Remains of his texts still exist in Latin and Greek. One of his sources was Columella. He was used by Vegetius.

There is an edition of his texts in Teubner (1980), De veterinaria medicina, by K.D. Fischer.
