= Bernd Ladwig =

German political philosopher (born 1966)

Bernd Ladwig (born 7 August 1966) is a German political philosopher who is a professor of political theory and political philosophy at the Freie Universität Berlin.

He studied political science at the Free University of Berlin from 1988 to 1994, and then read for a doctorate in philosophy at Berlin's Humboldt University, graduating in 1999. He took up a research post at Otto von Guericke University Magdeburg from 2000 to 2004, before becoming a juniorprofessor in modern political theory at the Freie Universität Berlin. In 2011, he became a Univ.-Prof..

== Select bibliography ==
- Ladwig, Bernd (2000). Gerechtigkeit und Verantwortung. Liberale Gleichheit für autonome Personen. Berlin: Akademie Verlag.
- Ladwig, Bernd (2009). Moderne politische Theorie. Fünfzehn Vorlesungen zur Einführung Schwalbach/Taunus: Wochenschau Verlag.
- Ladwig, Bernd (2011). Gerechtigkeitstheorien zur Einführung. Hamburg: Junius Verlag.
- Ladwig, Bernd (2020). Politische Philosophie der Tierrechte. Berlin: Suhrkamp Verlag.
