= Hipparchicus =

Treatise by Xenophon

- Author: Xenophon
- Original title: Ἱππαρχικός
- Language: Ancient Greek
- Publication place: Athens
- Original text: Ἱππαρχικός at Greek Wikisource
- Translation: Hipparchicus at Perseus
- written: circa 350 BC; first printed edition: Filippo Giunti, 1516; first printing in England: Clarendon Press, 1693

Hipparchicus (Ἱππαρχικός, Hipparchikós) is one of the two treatises on horsemanship by the Athenian historian and soldier Xenophon (circa 430 – 354 BC). Other common titles for this work include The cavalry commander and The cavalry general. The other work by Xenophon on horsemanship is Περὶ ἱππικῆς, Perì hippikēs, usually translated as On horsemanship, De equis alendis or The Art of Horsemanship. The title De re equestri may refer to either one of the two works. Hipparchicus deals mainly with the duties of the cavalry commander (hipparchus), while On horsemanship deals with the selection, care and training of horses in general.

== History ==
The treatises of Xenophon were written in about 350 BC, and were considered the earliest extant works on horsemanship in any literature until the publication by Bedřich Hrozný in 1931 of a Hittite text, that by Kikkuli of the Mitanni Kingdom, which dates from about 1360 BC. A treatise on horsemanship by Pliny the Elder is believed lost, as was that by Simon of Athens, which is twice mentioned by Xenophon in On horsemanship. Some fragments of Simon's treatise survive, however; they were published by Franz Rühl in 1912.

== Early editions ==
The first printed edition of Hipparchicus is that in the complete edition of Xenophon of 1516 from the Giunti press:

- Begin. Ταδε ̓ενεστιν ̓εν τͅηδε τͅη βιβλͅω· Ξενοφωντος Κυρου Παιδειας βιβλια ηʹ ... Hæc in hoc libro continentur. X. Cyri pedias libri VIII. Anabaseos libri VII.; ... apomnemoneumaton; ... venatoria; ... de re equestri; ... de equis alendis; lacedæmonum resp.; ... atheniensium resp.; ... œconomica; ... hieron.; ... symposium; ... de græcorum gestis libri VII. [With dedication by E. Boninus] (editio princeps). Florentiæ: In ædibus P. Juntæ, 1516

The earliest printing in Greek in England may be:

- Ξ. Λογος περι Ἱππικης. Ἱππαρχικος. Κυνηγετικος. Accessere veterum testimonia de X. (Edited by H. Aldrich.)Ἐκ Θεατρου ἐν Ὀξονιᾳ, ᾳχζγ [Oxford: Clarendon Press 1693].

== Translations ==
Translations include:

- (various translators) The whole works of Xenophon London: Jones & Co. 1832, pp. 717–728 (full text)
