= Franz Rühl =

German historian (1845–1915)

Franz Rühl (26 October 1845, Hanau – 3 July 1915, Jena) was a German historian who published numerous works in the field of classical history. He was a son-in-law to anatomist Jacob Henle.

He studied history and philology at the universities of Jena and Marburg, receiving his doctorate in 1867. After graduation, he took a study trip to Italy and worked as a gymnasium teacher in Schleswig. In 1871 he obtained his habilitation at the University of Leipzig, and during the following year relocated to the Imperial University of Dorpat, where he subsequently became an associate professor of history. From 1876 onward, he was a professor at the University of Königsberg, serving as university rector in 1905/06.

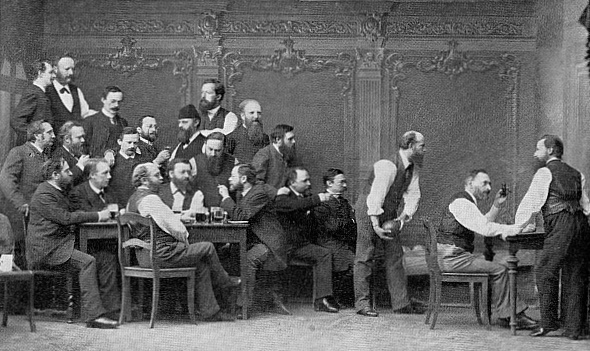
Rühl at a kegelabend of the Vereins für wissenschaftliche Heilkunde (University of Königsberg).

== Selected works ==
From 1872 up until his death, he published numerous articles in the scientific journal Rheinisches Museum für Philologie. He was the editor of Alfred von Gutschmid's Kleine Schriften (5 volumes, 1889–1904), and after the death of Wilhelm Adolf Schmidt, he published Schmidt's Handbuch der griechischen chronologie ("Handbook of Greek chronology", 1888). Rühl's other noted works are as follows:

- Die Quellen Plutarchs im Leben des Kimon, (dissertation), Marburg 1867 – Plutarch's sources in regards to the life of Cimon.
- Die Verbreitung des Justinus im Mittelalter, Leipzig 1871 – The spread of Justinus in the Middle Ages.
- Die Textesquellen des Justinus, Verlag von B. G. Teubner, Leipzig 1872 – Text sources of Justinus.
- as editor: Briefwechsel des Ministers und Burggrafen von Marienburg Theodor von Schön, 1896, (Theodor von Schön, Georg Heinrich Pertz, Johann Gustav Droysen).
- Chronologie des Mittelalters und der Neuzeit, 1897 – Chronology of the Middle Ages and modern times.
