= Hiero (Xenophon) =

Dialogue by Xenophon

Hiero (Greek: Ἱέρων, Hiéron) is a minor work by Xenophon, set as a dialogue between Hiero, tyrant of Syracuse, Magna Graecia, and the lyric poet Simonides about 474 BC. The dialogue is a response to the assumption that a tyrant's life is more pleasant than a commoner's. Having lived as both, Hiero breaks down this misconception, arguing that a tyrant does not have any more access to happiness than a private person. Some of this concept is considered in the Sword of Damocles parable, several centuries later.

Taken at face value, the Hiero appears to defend the superiority of tyranny over other forms of political organization. At the very least, Simonides praises the life of Hiero, a man who acquires power in the most unscrupulous manner and deprives the Syracusans of freedom. However, if read carefully, the Hiero indicates that a private life is superior to living life as a tyrant. Tyrants enjoy dominating others, but desire even more to be loved and honestly praised by those around them. Tyrants are thus trapped in an endless cycle of violence and fear. They cannot give up their power for fear of losing the attention of others and for fear that those they previously oppressed will not immediately execute them.

The dialogue, like many of Xenophon's works, does not receive much scholarly attention today. However, it was the nominal subject of Leo Strauss' analysis On Tyranny, which initiated his famous dialogue with Alexandre Kojève on the role of philosophy in politics.

== Bibliography ==
- Strauss, Leo "Restatement on Xenophon's Hiero", in What is Political Philosophy? And Other Studies. Ed. Leo Strauss. University of Chicago Press, 1959 (ISBN 0-226-77713-8).
- Levy, David "An Introduction to the Hiero", in Xenophon: The Shorter Writings. Ed. Gregory A. McBrayer. Cornell University Press, 2018 (LCCN 2017-39249).
