= On Horsemanship =

Treatise on horsemanship by Xenophon

On Horsemanship is the English title usually given to Περὶ ἱππικῆς, peri hippikēs, one of the two treatises on horsemanship by the Athenian historian and soldier Xenophon (c. 430–354 BC). Other common titles for this work are De equis alendis and The Art of Horsemanship. The other work by Xenophon on horsemanship is Ἱππαρχικὸς, hipparchikos, usually known as Hipparchicus, or The cavalry commander. The title De re equestri may refer to either of the two.

On horsemanship deals with the selection, care and training of horses in general. Military training and the duties of the cavalry commander are dealt with in the Hipparchicus.

== History ==
Written in about 355 BC, the treatises of Xenophon were considered the earliest extant works on horsemanship in any literature until the publication by Bedřich Hrozný in 1931 of a Hittite text, that by Kikkuli of the Mitanni Kingdom, which dates from about 1360 BC. A treatise on horsemanship by Pliny the Elder is believed lost, as was that by Simon of Athens, which is twice mentioned by Xenophon in On Horsemanship. Some fragments of Simon's treatise survive, however; they were published by Ruehl in 1912.

== Early editions ==
The first printed edition of On Horsemanship is that in the complete edition of Xenophon of 1516 from the Giunti press:

- Begin. Ταδε ̓ενεστιν ̓εν τͅηδε τͅη βιβλͅω· Ξενοφωντος Κυρου Παιδειας βιβλια ηʹ ... Hæc in hoc libro continentur. X. Cyri pedias libri VIII. Anabaseos libri VII.; ... apomnemoneumaton; ... venatoria; ... de re equestri; ... de equis alendis; lacedæmonum resp.; ... atheniensium resp.; ... œconomica; ... hieron.; ... symposium; ... de græcorum gestis libri VII. [With dedication by E. Boninus] (editio princeps) Florentiæ: In ædibus P. Juntæ, 1516

The earliest printing in Greek in England may be:

- Ξ. Λογος περι Ἱππικης. Ἱππαρχικος. Κυνηγετικος. Accessere veterum testimonia de X. (Edited by H. Aldrich.)Ἐκ Θεατρου ἐν Ὀξονιᾳ, ᾳχζγ [Oxford: Clarendon Press 1693]

== Translations ==
- Richard Berenger (1771). The history and art of horsemanship. London: T. Davies and T. Cadell, pages 219–234.
- Maurice Ashley Cooper et al. (1832). The whole works of Xenophon. London: Jones & Co., pages 717–728.
- Morris H. Morgan (1893). The Art of Horsemanship by Xenophon. Boston: Little, Brown, pages 13–68.

== Contents of On horsemanship ==
=== Part I: Selecting a Young Horse ===
Xenophon details what is to be examined when inspecting a horse to buy as a war-mount. He is especially careful to stress the importance of soundness. His recommendations include:

- A hoof of thick horn, and a frog that is held off the ground.
- Pasterns that are not too straight and upright, as these will jar the rider and are more likely to become sore, nor too long and low, as they will strike the ground when galloping and will be cut on rocks.
- Thick cannon bones
- Good bend in the knees, as the horse is less likely to stumble or to break down
- Thick and muscular forearms
- Broad chest, for both beauty and because the legs will be less likely to interfere
- A neck that is high-set and carried upward. Xenophon believed this would allow the horse to better see what was in front of him, and also make him less able to overpower the rider, because it would be more difficult to put his head down.
- A bony head with a small jawbone, a soft mouth, and prominent eyes for good vision
- Large nostrils, for good respiration and a fiercer appearance
- A large crest and small ears
- Tall withers, to help hold the rider on, and to give a good attachment between the shoulder and the body
- Double "loins" are more comfortable to sit on, as well as prettier
- A deep, rounded side, which allows the rider to stay on more easily, and allows the horse to better digest his food
- Broad, short loins, allowing the horse to raise the forehand and engage the hindend (Xenophon describes the ability to collect), and are stronger than long loins.
- The hindquarters should be muscular and firm, for speed
- The gaskins and buttocks should be well separated, so the horse stands wide behind, allowing him to be more balanced, and to give a prouder bearing
- He should not have large testicles

(also knowing how the young horse reacts when being ridden, and also the signs it knows and the signs that it was trained with,)

Xenophon then directs the reader to look at a young colt's cannons to predict his height.

Many of Xenophon's suggestions are still applied today when selecting a sport horse.

=== Part II: Breaking the Colt ===
Xenophon first makes a point to say that the reader should not waste his time nor endanger his health by personally breaking colts.

Before the horse is delivered to the trainer, the owner should know that he has a good temperament and gentle nature. The horse should trust people, knowing that they are the providers of food and water. If this is done correctly, the young colt should grow to love people. The groom should stroke or scratch the colt, so that he enjoys human company, and should take the young horse through crowds to accustom him to different sights and noises. If the colt is frightened, the groom should reassure him, rather than punish him, and teach the animal that there is nothing to fear.

=== Part III: Selecting an Older Horse ===
Xenophon writes that these passages are to help the reader from being cheated.

The age of the horse should first be determined. To do so, Xenophon directs the reader to look at the horse's teeth. If the horse has lost all of his milk teeth (making him older than five), the author suggests the reader not buy the horse.

The horse should then be bridled, to make sure he accepts the bit, and mounted, to assess if he will stand still for the rider. He should then be ridden away from the stable, to see if he is willing to leave other horses.

The softness of the animal's mouth may be determined by performing a volte in both directions. The horse should then be galloped, pulled up hard, and turned in the opposite direction to see if he is responsive to the rein. Xenophon also suggests that the reader make sure that the horse is docile to the whip, as an unsubmissive animal will only make for a disobedient mount, which would be especially dangerous in battle.

If the horse is intended as a war-mount, he should be jumped over ditches, walls, and on and off high banks, and should also be galloped up and down steep inclines. These tests can be used to determine his spirit and soundness. However, Xenophon urges the reader not to reject a horse that can not easily perform these tasks, as this is more likely due to lack of experience than inability, and if the horse is trained he will soon be able to perform these tasks easily. He does warn, however, that a nervous, skittish, or vicious horse is unacceptable as a war-mount.

Xenophon concludes that a good war-mount should be sound, gentle, fast, and above all: obedient.

=== Part IV: Caring for the Horse ===
The horse should be housed in a stable where he may be easily checked on by the master. This allows the master to ensure his animal is receiving appropriate care, to prevent his food from being stolen, and to watch to see whether the horse scatters his food.

Xenophon believed that if the horse scattered his food he was showing symptoms of too much blood, and was in need of veterinary care, that he was over-fatigued, and required rest, or that he suffered from indigestion or some other sickness. He stressed that this symptom should be used as an early sign of sickness so that the horse's keeper will be able to catch the illness early.

Xenophon also stressed the importance of caring for the horse's feet. He suggested that the flooring of the stable should not be damp and should not be smooth, and that the stable should therefore be built with sloped channels of cobblestones the size of the horse's hoof. The stableyard should be of pebbles to strengthen the hooves, and should be surrounded by a skirt of iron so that the pebbles do not scatter. These surfaces are intended to strengthen the hoof wall, frog, and sole of the hoof.

The groom should curry the horse after he is fed each morning, and should unhalter the horse after he has been fed.

The mouth should be cared for and made soft with the application of oil.

=== Part V: Grooming the Horse ===
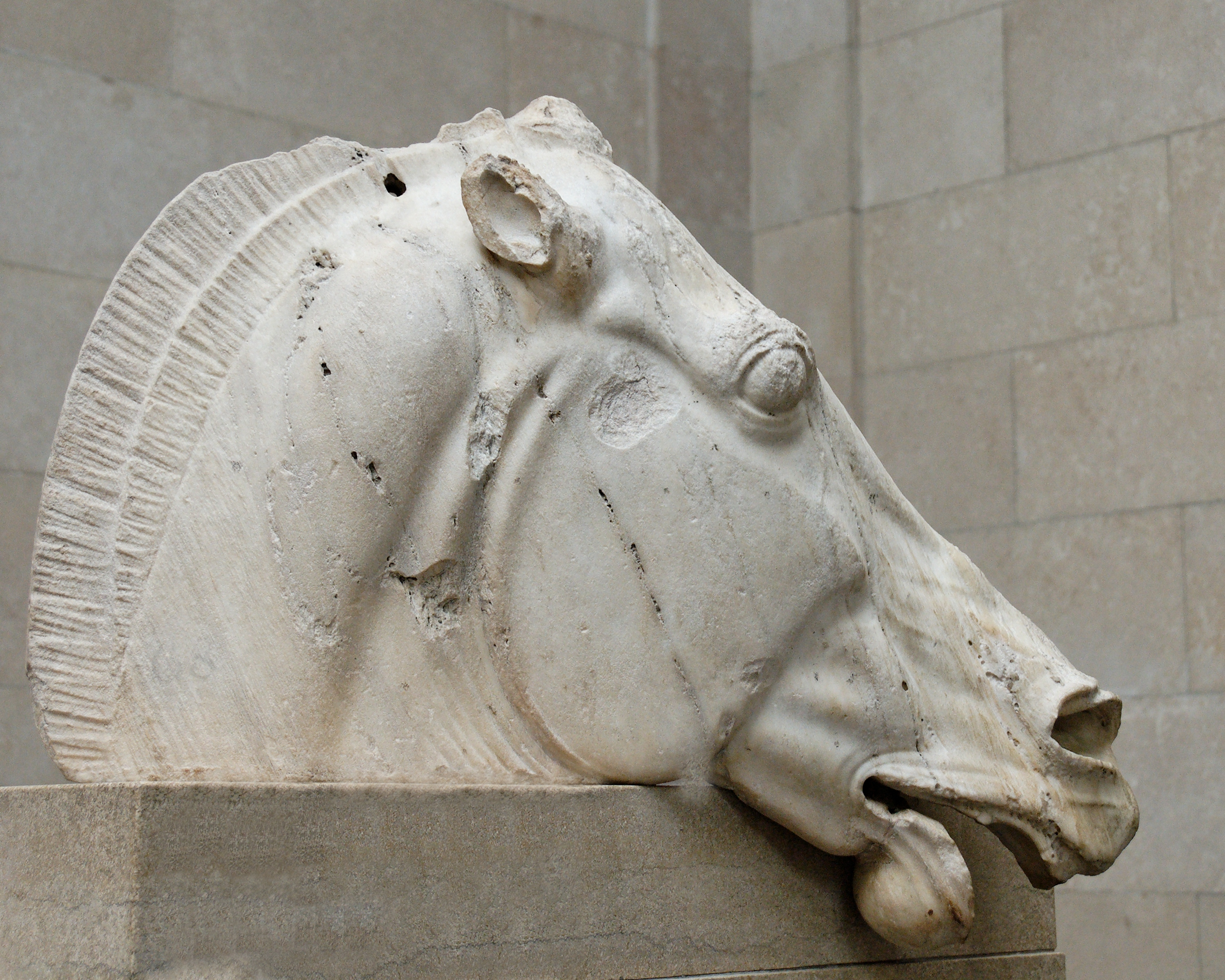
The ideal head of the warhorse

The horse's groom should be well-trained. He should not tie the halter to the manger where the rope meets the head, as the horse is likely to knock his head on the manger and injure himself. The sores will then make him less tractable when bridled or groomed. He should also tie the horse at a point above the level of his head, so that, when the horse tosses his head, he slackens the rope rather than tightening it.

The groom should be instructed to clean the animal's stall every day. He should attach a muzzle to the mouth when the horse is taken out to be groomed or to roll, or whenever he is taken somewhere without a bit, so that the horse cannot bite, preventing the horse from that bad vice.

The groom should first clean the head and mane, and work his way down the animal's body. The hair should be brushed first against the grain, to lift the dirt, and then in the direction of the hair, to remove the dirt. However, the back of the horse should not be touched with a brush, but the groom should use only his hand to clean it, in the direction of the hair's growth, so that the area where the rider sits is not injured.

The head should be cleaned only with water, because it is bony and will be injured otherwise. The forelock should also be cleaned with water alone. Xenophon notes that the forelock prevents irritants from getting in the horse's eyes. The tail and mane should be washed, to keep the hairs growing, as the tail is used to swat insects and the mane may be grabbed by the rider more easily if long. Xenophon also notes that the mane and tail are the pride of the horse, as a broodmare will not allow herself to be easily covered by an ass unless her mane is clipped.

It is suggested that the legs not be washed, as the hooves deteriorate from daily washing, but should simply be rubbed and curried by hand. The belly should also not be washed, not only because it is annoying to the horse, but because a clean belly will collect more things on it, and the area will soon be dirty again.

=== Part VI: Grooming and Bridling the Horse Correctly and Safely ===
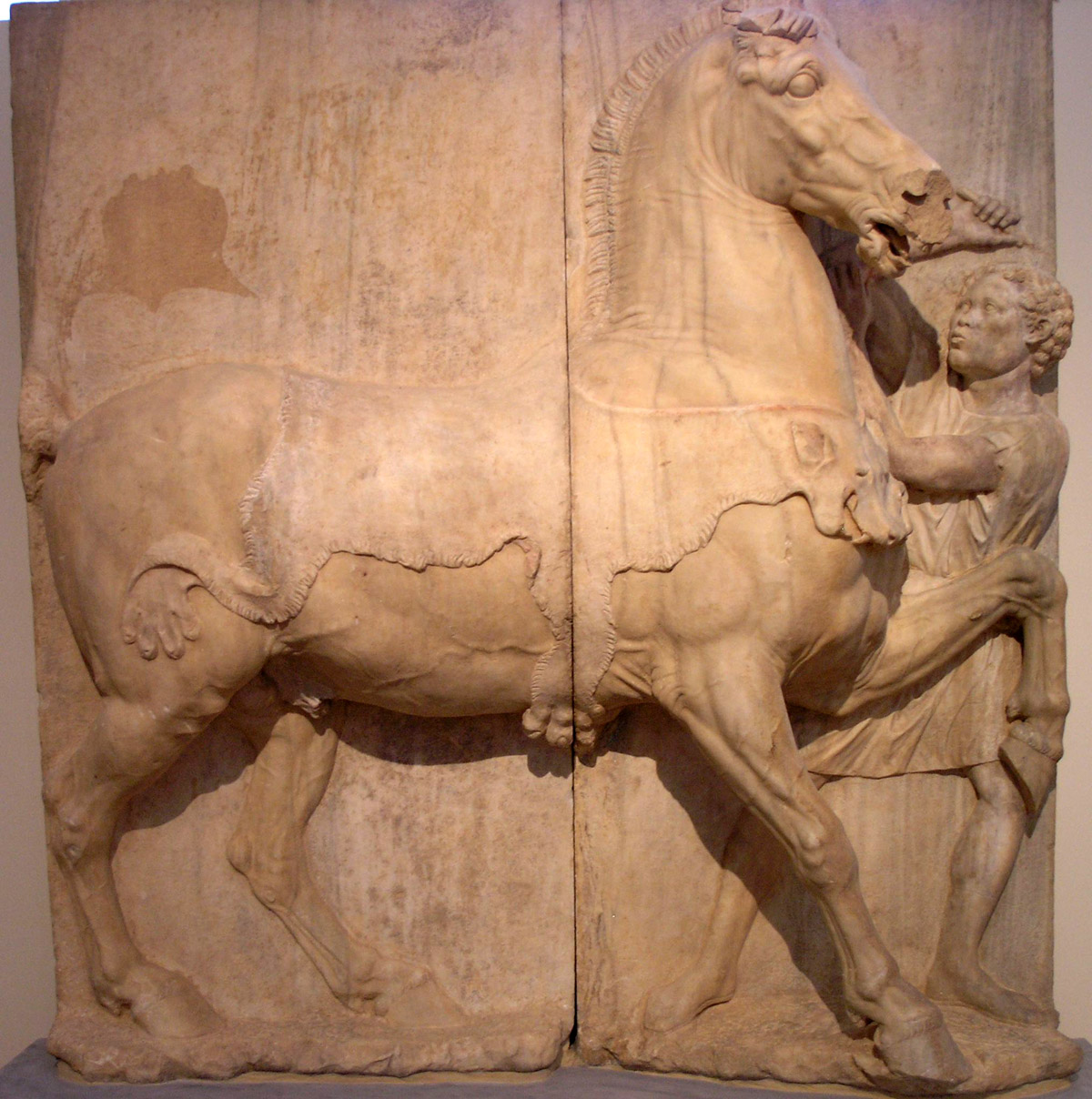
An Ethiopian groom and his charge

The groom should face backward when grooming the horse, and stand out of the way of the animal's leg near the shoulder blade, so as not to be kicked or knocked by the knee. He should avoid approaching the head or tail straight on, as the horse can easily overpower him by rearing or kicking. Therefore, the side is the safest place to stand.

The groom should clean the frog by picking up the hoof and folding the pastern upward.

When leading the horse, the groom should not lead in front. To do so would prevent him from protecting himself, and would allow the horse to do as he pleases. The horse should also not lead the way, as he may easily cause trouble or might turn around to face the groom. Therefore, it is best to lead the horse from the side, as there he will be most controllable and it is the easiest place for him to be quickly mounted should the need arise.

To insert the bit into the horse's mouth, the groom should stand on the near side of the horse, place the reins over the animal's head, and raise the headstall in his right hand while directing the bit to the horse's mouth with his left. If the horse refuses the bit, the groom should hold the bit against the horse's teeth with his fingers, and insert his left thumb in the horse's jaws. If the horse still refuses, the groom should press the animal's lips against his canine tooth, which should make the horse open his mouth.

Here Xenophon suggests that the horse be bitted not only before he is to be worked, but also before he is fed and led home from a ride, so that he does not necessarily associate the bit with discomfort and labor.

The groom should know how to give a leg up in the Persian fashion, so that he may help his master, should he be old, to mount.

Xenophon then states that a horse should never be dealt with angrily. If the horse fears an object, he should be taught that there is nothing to fear. The object should be touched by the person before the horse is led gently towards it. Hurting the animal will only increase his fear, and he will associate pain with the object itself.

The rider should be able to mount from the ground, as not all horses know how to lower their back.

=== Part VII: Mounting, Rider's Position, and Training ===
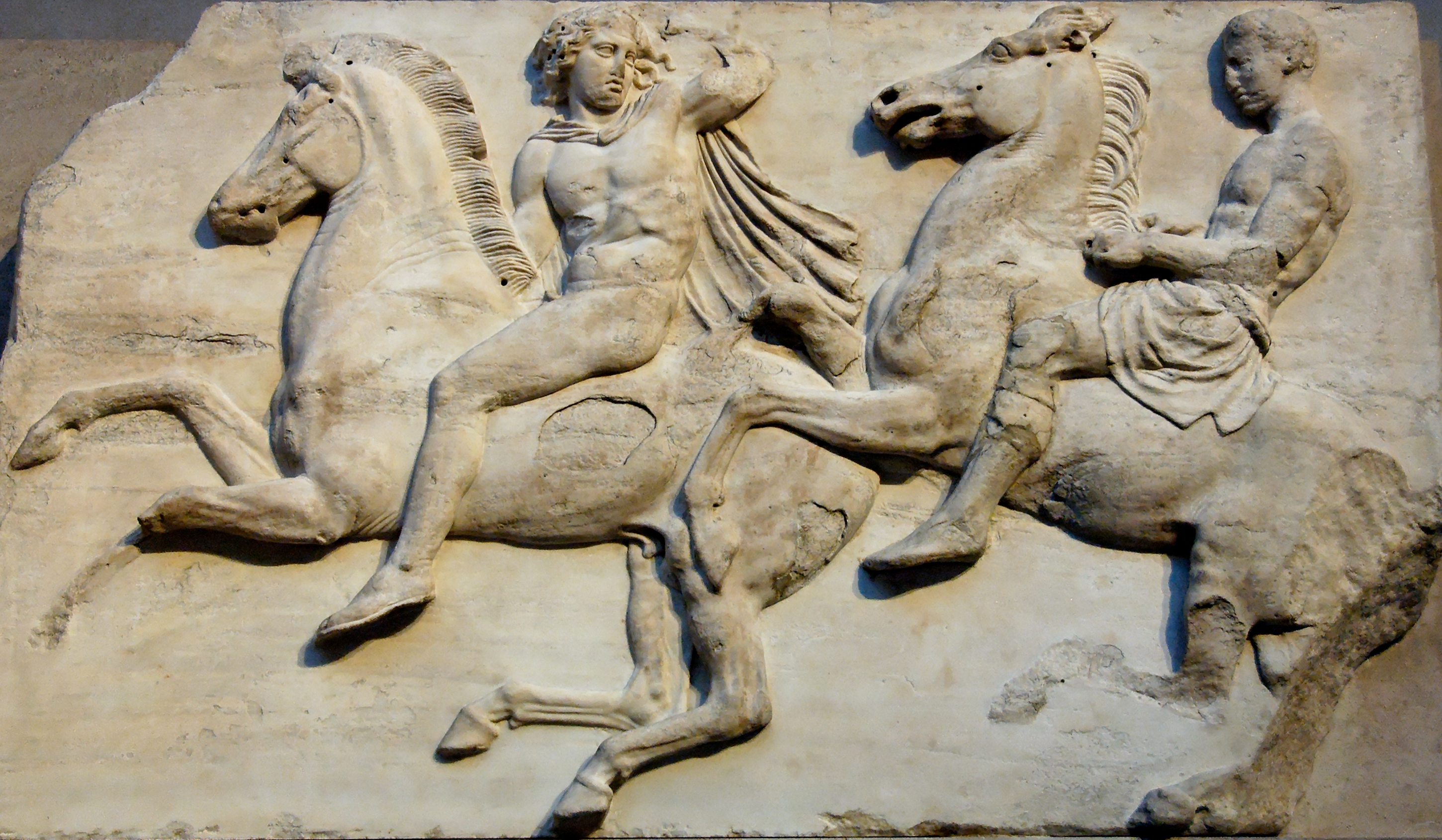
Two young Greek men, galloping their mounts.

To mount, the rider should take the leading rein (presumably there was a third rein for leading the horse) in his left hand and hold it slack. With his right hand he should grasp the reins, along with a small lock of mane so that he does not hit the horse in the mouth when he mounts. The rider should not hit the horse in the back when he mounts, but bring his leg completely over.

The soldier should be able to mount not only on the left side, but also on the right, so if he is leading the horse in his left hand and carrying his spear in his right he may quickly mount should the need arise (such as a sudden battle).

When mounted, the rider should sit on the horse not as if he were sitting in a chair, but as if he were standing with his legs apart. This will allow him to hold on with his thighs, and the upright position will allow him to throw a javelin with greater power. The lower legs should hang loosely from the knee, as a stiff leg is more likely to break should it collide with an obstacle. The rider's body above his hips should be supple, as he will be able to move more easily when fighting and will be less likely to be unseated if he is shoved. The left arm of the rider should be held against his side, giving him the greatest freedom and the firmest hold of the reins. This position is still considered the classically correct way to sit on a horse, regardless of the type of riding performed.

The horse should stand quietly once the rider mounts and as he adjusts his rein length or grip on the spear. The reins should be strong, but not slippery or thick, so that the rider may hold his spear in his left hand along with the reins, should he wish.

The rider should start riding at the walk, so the horse is not as excited. If the horse holds his head low, the rider should raise his hands, and if the head is held too high the rider should hold his hand slightly lowered. The horse should then be trotted.

Xenophon gives clear instruction as to how to give the aids for the correct lead for the canter/gallop. This includes aiding the horse when the opposite leg is coming forward, as the leg on the desired lead is about to move forward. He also suggests turning the horse in the direction of the desired lead.

Xenophon suggests using the volte as an exercise for the horse, as it makes him easy to turn in either direction and makes both sides of the mouth equally responsive. He also describes an ovular pattern, with a wheeling performed on the turns and galloping on the straight sections. However, he notes that on the curve the horse should be slowed, as it is unsafe to make a tight turn at high speeds, especially when the footing is slippery. When collecting the horse, the rider should try to use as little rein as possible. He should not change the incline of his body, as he is likely to end up falling off. After the horse has been turned, he should immediately be urged to a fast gallop. This is to help him practice charging, which will be useful in battle.

The horse should be allowed a short break, before being suddenly asked to gallop his fastest away from other horses. He should then be halted, turned, and galloped back toward them.

The horse should never be dismounted near other horses nor a group of people, but on the exercising ground where he was worked.

=== Part VIII: Advanced Training ===
In this section, Xenophon outlines advanced training exercises for the war-horse, including jumping and cross-country riding. He also instructs the rider on how to perform these exercises, so that both the horse and rider may be well trained, and better able to help each other in difficult situations.

A green horse, that has never jumped, should first be introduced to a ditch on the leading rein, which should be held loose. The master should cross the obstacle first, and then pull the leading rein tight to encourage the horse to follow. If he does not, a whip should be applied smartly. Xenophon mentions that the horse will not only clear the obstacle, but will overjump it, and will thereafter not require a switch to entice him to jump but simply the sight of someone coming behind him. When the horse is comfortable jumping in this manner, he may be mounted and ridden first over small, and then over larger, trenches.

When the horse is about to leap over any obstacle, Xenophon recommends applying the spur on takeoff, so that the horse will use his whole body over the obstacle and make a safer jump. If this is not done, he may lag with his hind end.

When training a horse to gallop up or down a steep incline, he should first be taught on soft ground. Xenophon mentions that the reader should not fear that the horse will dislocate a shoulder when running downhill.

Xenophon then turns to the position of the rider. For galloping, the rider should lean slightly forward as the horse takes off, as the horse will be less likely to slip from under the rider. When pulling the horse up, the rider should lean back, which will lessen the shock of the sudden change in speed. Xenophon also suggests the rider loosen the reins and grab the mane when jumping a ditch or climbing an incline, so that he does not pull the horse in the mouth. Going down a steep incline, the rider should throw himself straight backward and hold the horse with the bit.

It is recommended that these exercises be varied in the place they are performed and in duration, so the horse does not become bored.

As an exercise for the rider to improve his seat at the gallop over all terrain, Xenophon suggests hunting on horseback. If this is not possible, he suggests two riders work together, with one chasing the other. The horseman chasing should have blunted javelins to throw at the other.

Xenophon ends this section by reiterating the fact that the master should show kindness to the horse, and punish him only when he is disobedient. The horse will then be more willing, knowing that obedience is rewarded.

=== Part IX: Riding the Spirited and Dull Horse ===
Xenophon emphasizes the importance when riding a very spirited horse of annoying the animal as little as possible. After mounting, the rider should sit quietly for a longer period than usual, and only ask the horse to move off with the slightest of aids. He should begin at a slow gait, and only gradually work his way up to faster gaits. Sudden signals will only disturb the horse.

To pull up the spirited horse, the rider should do so very slowly and quietly, rather than harshly, bringing the bit slowly against him to coax him to slow down. A spirited horse will be happier if he is allowed to gallop on straight rather than continually being asked to turn, and should be allowed to carry out a pace for a long time, as this has a soothing effect and will help him relax. One should not ask for several fast gallops with the intent of tiring the horse, as that will simply anger him. The spirited horse should always be held on check, so that he may not run away with his rider. He should never be raced against other horses, as that will only make him more difficult to handle.

As a rule, a smooth bit is better than a rough bit. If a rough bit is used, it should be used gently enough that it resembles a smooth bit (this principle is still a basis used today).

A rider must be especially careful to keep a quiet seat on a spirited horse, and to touch him as little as possible, except with the parts of the body needed to keep a firm seat.

The master should never approach a spirited horse in excitement, and should avoid bringing things toward the animal that frighten it. When battle is to begin, it is best for the rider to halt and rest the horse, and if possible to feed him. However, Xenophon suggests that overly spirited horses not be bought for the purpose of war.

Xenophon suggests that dull horses be ridden in a manner in every respect opposite to that used for the spirited horse.

=== Part X: Creating a Showy Horse and Advice on Bitting ===
In the next section, Xenophon describes how to make a horse showy, with a great and noble bearing. Ahead of his time, he emphasized that the rider should not pull on the bit nor spur or whip the horse, as this type of riding causes the opposite effect, simply distracting and frightening the animal and causing him to dislike being ridden. Instead, Xenophon urges, the horse must enjoy himself. He should be trained to be ridden on a loose rein, to hold his head high, arch his neck, and paw with his front legs, taking pleasure in being ridden.

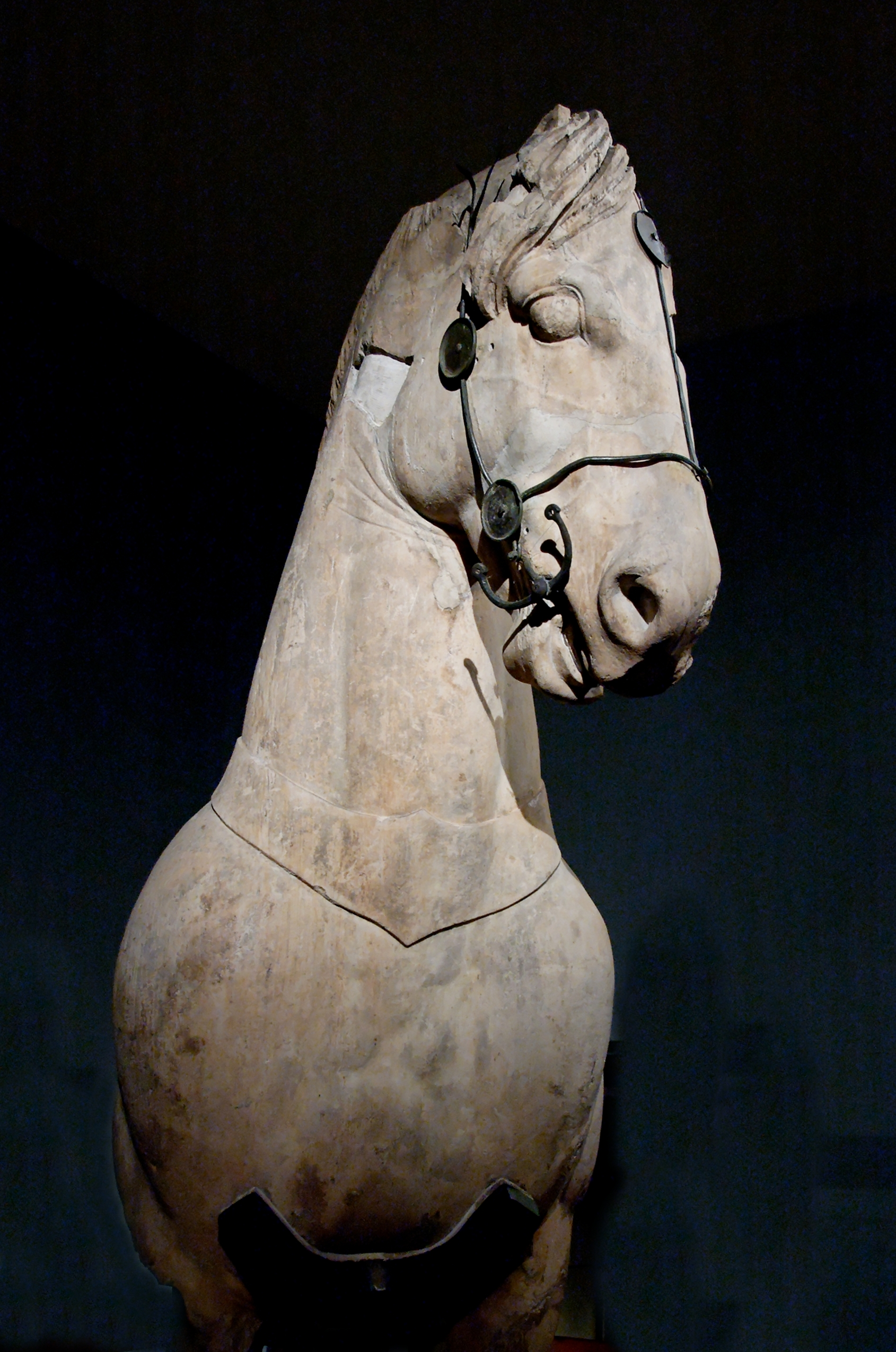
A Greek statue showing the bitting and bridling system

To do so, Xenophon suggests the rider have two bits: a milder one, that is smooth with large discs, and a harsher one, with heavy, flat discs and sharp spikes. When the horse seizes the harsher one, he will not like the pain, and will drop the bit. The rider may control the severity of the bit by controlling the amount of slack in the rein. Then, when he is ridden in the milder bit, he will be grateful for its smoothness, and will perform all his movements with greater happiness and exuberance. The large discs on the smooth bit will prevent him from taking hold.

All bits should be flexible so that the horse, as he would in a stiff bit, can not take hold of it in his jaws and pull. With a loose bit, the horse will keep a softer mouth as he has nothing to grab, and will drop the bit from his bars. Xenophon goes on to describe a flexible bit as one with broad and smooth junctions, which bend easily, and with several parts fitted around the axles that are not closely packed. A stiff bit would be one in which the parts do not easily slide, but push into each other.

The rider, no matter which bit is used, when turning should pull the bit enough to create a response, but not so much that the horse tosses his head aside. At the instant where the horse raises his neck to the pull, the rider should give the bit and lighten the pressure as a reward. Therefore, when the horse is enjoying arching his neck and carrying his head high, the rider should not ask the horse for severe exertion, but be gentle, as if he wants to give the horse a rest. The horse will then be more likely to take up a rapid pace, as a horse enjoys moving at a rapid pace, as long as he is not asked to do so excessively.

If the rider signals the horse to gallop off, and holds him back with the bit, the horse will collect himself and raise his chest and forelegs. This will not be with natural suppleness, however, because the horse is annoyed by the restraint. However, if horse's fire is kindled (which may be assumed to mean that he has energy and power), and the rider relaxes the bit, the horse will move forward with pride, a stately bearing, and pliant legs. He will not only be willing, but will show himself off in the greatest grandeur, spirited and beautiful.

=== Part XI: Creating a Parade Horse ===
A horse to be used for parade and state processions should have a high spirit and powerful body. Although some might believe that flexible legs will allow the horse to rear, this is not the case. Instead, the animal must have a supple loin that is short and strong (here, Xenophon refers to the area between the ribs and gaskins, which may be assumed to be the flank, rather than the loins). The horse will then be able to place his hindquarters under, and when pulled up with the bit he will lower himself onto his hocks and raise his front end so that his whole belly down to his sheath may be seen. At the moment the horse does this, the rider should relax the rein, so that the horse performs it of his own free will.

There are several methods of teaching the horse to rear. Some switch the horse under its hocks; others have an attendant run alongside the horse and strike him on the gaskins. However, Xenophon prefers a gentler method, using the horse's desire for a reward should he be obedient. He goes on to say that a horse's performance would be no more beautiful than that of a dancer taught by whips and goads if he were forced under the same conditions. The horse should, instead, perform of his own accord in response to set signals by the rider.

To do this, Xenophon says, for example, gallop the horse hard until he begins to prance and show his airs, at which time the rider should at once dismount and remove the bit. This reward will cause the horse, at a later time, to show himself off of his own accord.

If the master of such a splendid horse is a general of cavalry, and if his horse's airs and great prancing makes the slightest move forward (what could possible be interpreted as the passage), so that the cavalry horses may follow behind him at a walking pace, and the group move forward at a pace neither too fast nor too slow, not only the general will have a thrilling effect. If it brings out the fire and spirit of the neighing and snorting animals, the whole company will be a thrilling spectacle.

=== Part XII: The Equipment for Battle ===
In the final section of his treatise, Xenophon describes the equipment for both the horse and the rider when riding into battle. For the rider, he mentions that the corselet should fit properly, and that the rider should use a Boeotian helmet.

The gauntlet was recommended to protect the left hand of the horseman (which holds the reins), protecting the shoulder, arm, elbow and armpit. Its fit is further discussed.

The horse's armor was then discussed, with a frontlet, breastplate, and thigh-pieces. The belly of the horse was also recommended to be protected with a saddle cloth. The limbs of the horse should also be protected.

Xenophon goes on to discuss his weapons of choice, the machaira and two javelins of cornel-wood, and explains how properly to throw the javelin while mounted.

== See also ==
- Kikkuli
- Horses in warfare
- List of writers on horsemanship
