= Praxiphanes =

Ancient Greek philosopher

Praxiphanes (Greek: Πραξιφάνης) a Peripatetic philosopher, was a native of Mytilene, who lived a long time in Rhodes. He lived in the time of Demetrius Poliorcetes and Ptolemy I Soter, and was a pupil of Theophrastus, about 322 BC. He subsequently opened a school himself, in which Epicurus is said to have been one of his pupils. Praxiphanes paid special attention to grammatical studies, and is hence named along with Aristotle as the founder and creator of the science of grammar.

== Writings ==
Of the writings of Praxiphanes, which appear to have been numerous, two are especially mentioned, a Dialogue ποιητῶν (Poiitón, 'Poetry') in which Plato and Isocrates were the speakers, and an historical work cited by Marcellinus in his Life of Thucydides under the title of Περὶ ἱστορίας (Perí istorías, 'About History').

Praxiphanes also wrote a works titled On Friendship, On Rare Words, On the Universe, On Poems, and commentaries on Homer's Odyssey, Hesiod's Works and Days, Sophocles' Oedipus at Colonus, and Plato's Timaeus.
