= Papyrus Oxyrhynchus 19 =

Fragment of Herodotus's Histories

Papyrus Oxyrhynchus 19 (P. Oxy. 19) is a fragment of the first book of the Histories of Herodotus (chapter 76), written in Greek. It was discovered by Grenfell and Hunt in 1897 in Oxyrhynchus. The fragment is dated to the second or third century. It is housed in Princeton University Library (Curator of Manuscripts). The text was published by Grenfell and Hunt in 1898.

The manuscript was written on papyrus in a roll. The fragment is 125 by 80 mm and contains 16 lines of text. The text is written in small square uncial script.

== See also ==
- Oxyrhynchus Papyri
- Papyrus Oxyrhynchus 18
- Papyrus Oxyrhynchus 20
