= Papyrus Oxyrhynchus 18 =

Ancient papyrus fragment

Papyrus Oxyrhynchus 18 (P. Oxy. 18) is a fragment of the first book of the Histories of Herodotus (chapters 105-106), written in Greek. It was discovered by Grenfell and Hunt in 1897 in Oxyrhynchus. The fragment is dated to the third century AD. It is housed in the British Library (Department of Manuscripts). The text was published by Grenfell and Hunt in 1898.

The manuscript was written on papyrus in the form of a roll. The measurements of the fragment are 182 by 87 mm. The fragment contains 13 lines of text. The text is written in a good-sized round formal uncial hand. The style of writing resembles great biblical codices. It has deep margins. The fragment supports the manuscript tradition though there are a few variations in the form of words representing differences in dialect.

== See also ==
- Oxyrhynchus Papyri
- Papyrus Oxyrhynchus 17
- Papyrus Oxyrhynchus 19
