= Papyrus Oxyrhynchus 17 =

Greek papyrus fragment

Papyrus Oxyrhynchus 17 (P. Oxy. 17) is a fragment of the second book of Thucydides' History of the Peloponnesian War (chapters 7–8), written in Greek. It was discovered by Grenfell and Hunt in 1897 in Oxyrhynchus. The fragment is dated to the second or third century and is housed in the Milton S. Eisenhower Library at Johns Hopkins University. The text was published by Grenfell and Hunt in 1898.

The manuscript was written on papyrus in the form of a roll. The measurements of the fragment are 70 by 53 mm. The fragment contains 13 lines of text. The text is written in a small and upright uncial hand. It has only one textual variant.

== See also ==
- Oxyrhynchus Papyri
- Papyrus Oxyrhynchus 16
- Papyrus Oxyrhynchus 18
