= Martin Hammond =

English classical scholar (born 1944)

Martin Hammond (born 15 November 1944) is an English classical scholar and former public school headmaster.

== Early life ==
Hammond was educated at Rossall Junior School, Winchester College and Balliol College, Oxford, where he took his first degree in Literae Humaniores, the Oxford course in Latin and Greek Literature, Roman and Greek history, and Ancient and Modern philosophy.

== Career ==
Hammond became a schoolmaster at Eton College, where he became head of Classics for six years and subsequently Master in College. He was Boris Johnson's housemaster, and some critical comments he made in Johnson's house report are often quoted.

Hammond gained his first appointment as a Headmaster at the City of London School and then transferred as head to Tonbridge School. After retiring, he served as a governor of Culford School in Suffolk.

He has translated numerous classical works, including Homer's Iliad (1987) and Odyssey (2000) and Marcus Aurelius's Meditations and Thucydides' History of the Peloponnesian War, and Flavius Josephus' The Jewish War (ISBN 978-0-19-964602-9 (2017)).

== Publications ==
=== Translations ===
- Homer, The Iliad
- Homer, The Odyssey
- Thucydides, History of the Peloponnesian War
- Marcus Aurelius, Meditations
- Arrian, The Anabasis of Alexander
- Arrian, Indica
