= Papyrus Oxyrhynchus 16 =

First century papyrus fragment in Greek

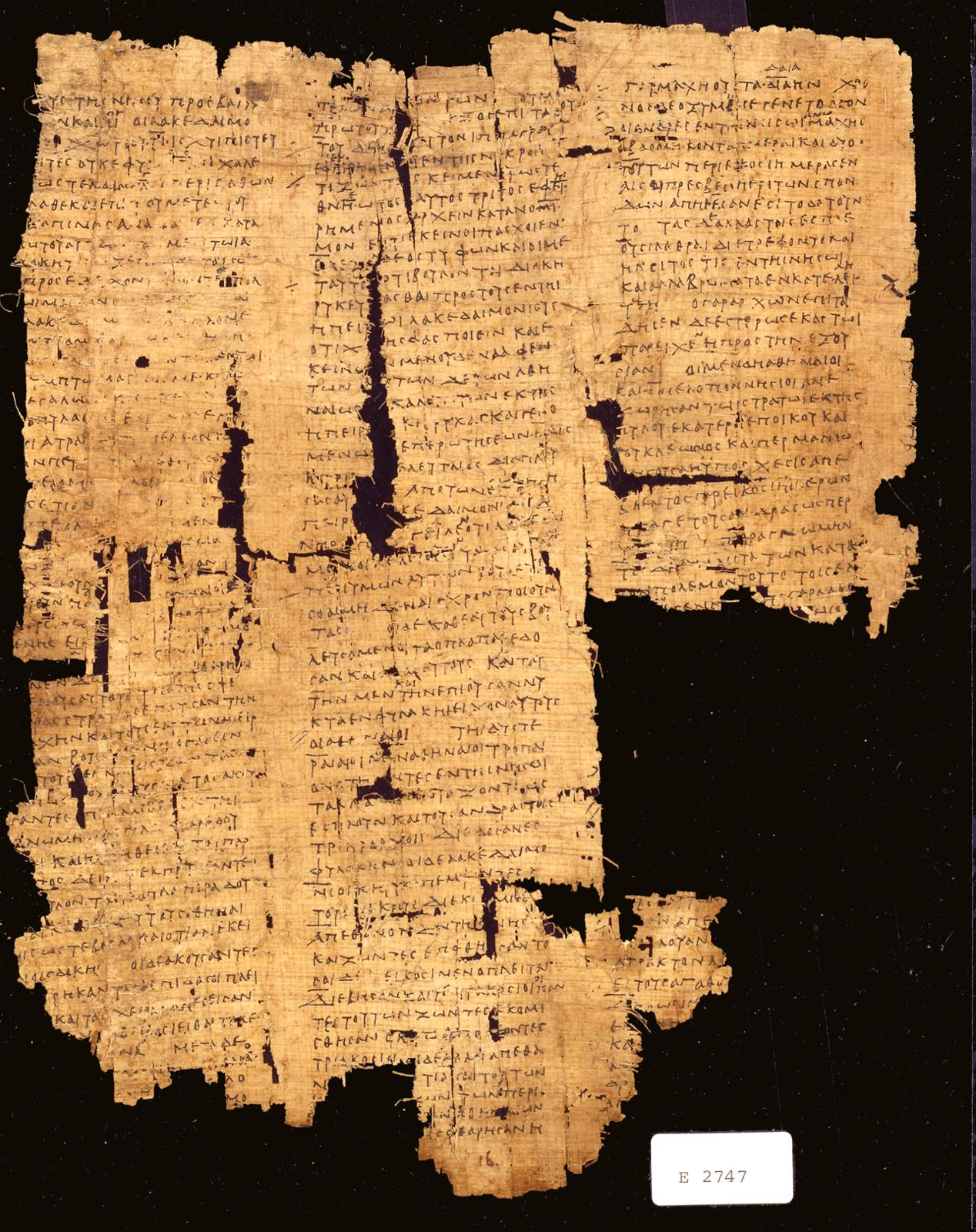
P. Oxy. 16

Papyrus Oxyrhynchus 16 (P. Oxy. 16) is a fragment of the fourth book of the History of the Peloponnesian War by Thucydides (chapters 36-41) in Greek. It was discovered by Grenfell and Hunt in 1897 in Oxyrhynchus. The fragment is dated to the first century. It is housed in the University of Pennsylvania Museum (E 2747). The text was published by Grenfell and Hunt in 1898.

The manuscript was written on papyrus in the form of a roll. The measurements of the fragment are 256 by 200 mm. The fragment contains three columns, written in 50-53 lines per column. The text is written in a small and irregular uncial hand.

== See also ==
- Oxyrhynchus Papyri
- Papyrus 1
- Papyrus Oxyrhynchus 15
- Papyrus Oxyrhynchus 17
