= Marcellinus (writer) =

6th-century AD biographer of Thucydides

Marcellinus was the author of a Life of Thucydides, found in some of the ancient commentaries on the History of the Peloponnesian War by Thucydides. Nothing else is known for certain about this Marcellinus, but he probably lived in about the 6th century AD, and compiled his biography from passages in early writers, adding his own observations. Because he lived so long after Thucydides, the statements of Marcellinus must be treated with caution unless they are supported by other evidence.
