= History of the Peloponnesian War =

5th century BC history book by Thucydides

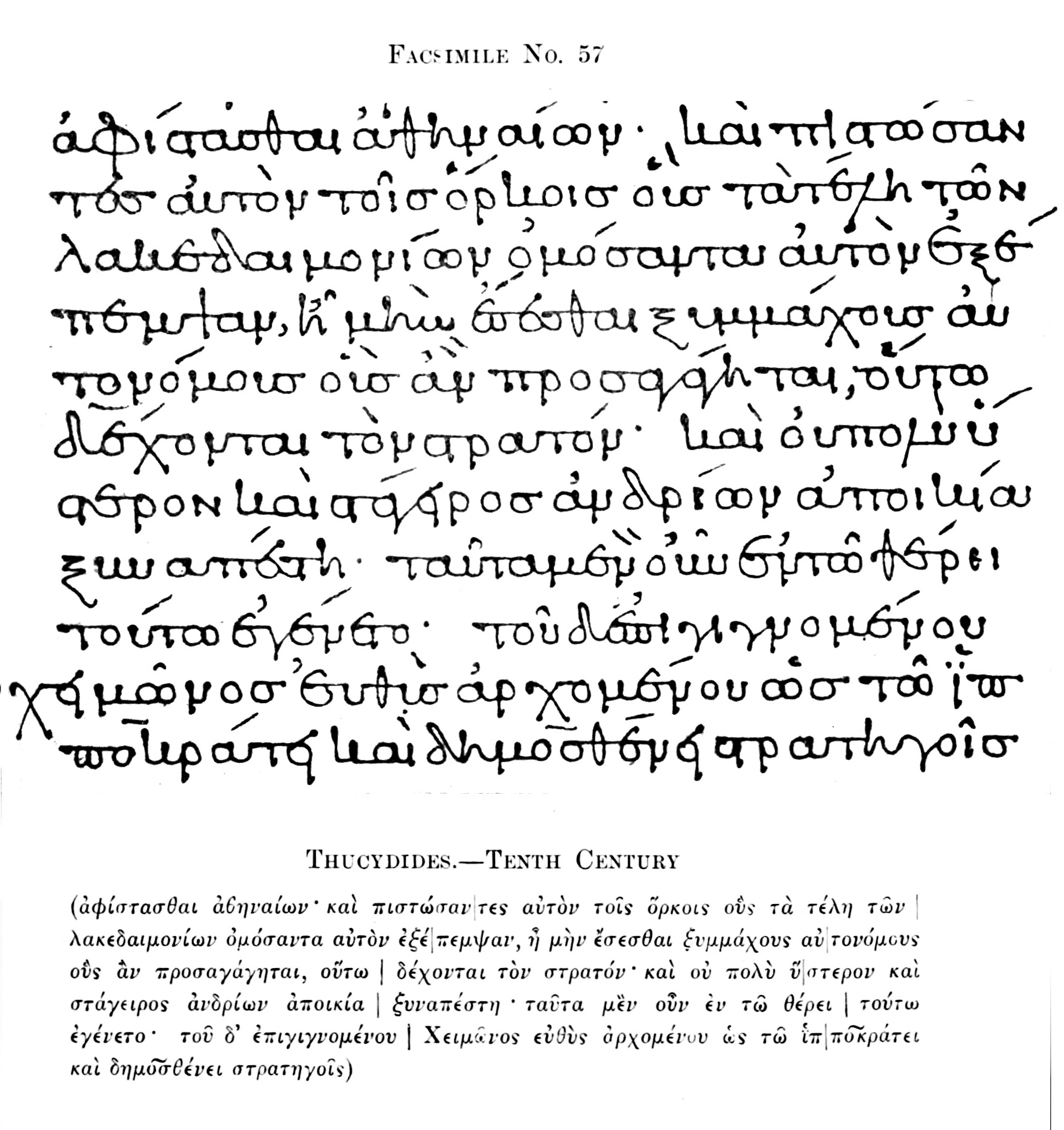
- 10th century minuscule manuscript of Thucydides’ History
- Author: Thucydides
- Language: Ancient Greek
- Genre: History
- Publisher: Various
- Publication date: Late 5th century BC
- Publication place: Athens

The History of the Peloponnesian War (Note: Also known or titled as The Peloponnesian War, The War of the Peloponnesians and the Athenians. Peloponnesian is pronounced /pɛləpəˈniːʃən/.) is a historical account of the Peloponnesian War (431–404 BC), which was fought between the Peloponnesian League (led by Sparta) and the Delian League (led by Athens). The account, apparently unfinished, does not cover the full war, ending mid-sentence in 411 BC. It was written by Thucydides, an Athenian historian who also served as an Athenian general during the war. His account of the conflict is widely considered to be a classic and regarded as one of the earliest scholarly works of history. Later scholars divide the History into eight books for convenience.

Analyses of the History generally occur in one of two camps. On the one hand, some scholars such as J. B. Bury view the work as an objective and scientific piece of history. The judgment of Bury reflects this traditional interpretation of the History as "severe in its detachment, written from a purely intellectual point of view, unencumbered with platitudes and moral judgments, cold and critical."

On the other hand, in keeping with more recent interpretations that are associated with reader-response criticism, the History can be read as a piece of literature rather than an objective record of the historical events. This view is embodied in the words of W. R. Connor, who describes Thucydides as "an artist who responds to, selects and skillfully arranges his material, and develops its symbolic and emotional potential."

== Historical method ==
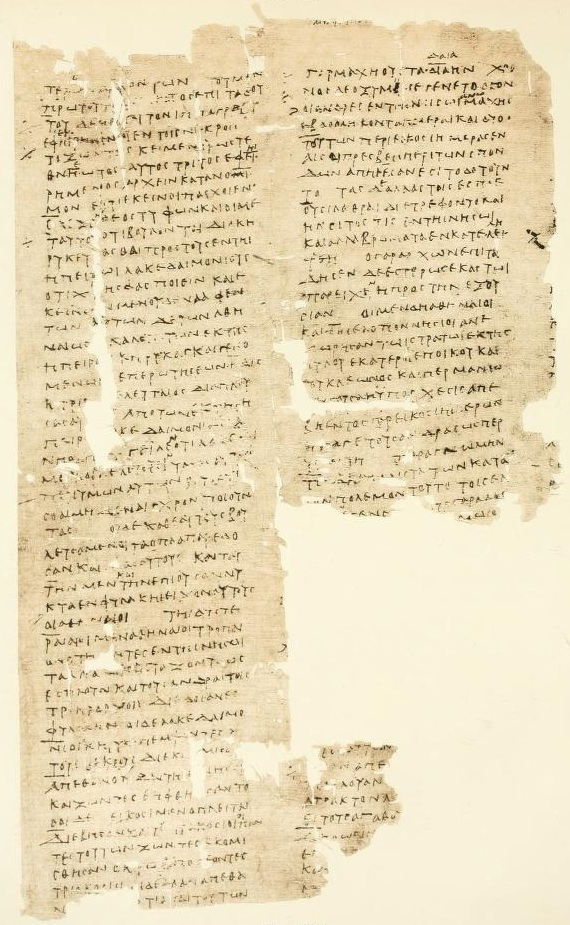
P. Oxy. 16, fragment of a 1st century manuscript

Thucydides is considered to be one of the key figures in the development of Western history, thus making his methodology the subject of much analysis in the area of historiography.

=== Chronology ===
Thucydides is one of the first western historians to employ a strict standard of chronology, recording events by year, with each year consisting of the summer campaign season and a less active winter season. This method contrasts sharply with Herodotus.

=== Speeches ===
Thucydides also makes extensive use of speeches in order to elaborate on the event in question. While the inclusion of long first-person speeches is somewhat alien to modern historical method, in the context of ancient Greek oral culture, speeches are expected. These include addresses given to troops by their generals before battles and numerous political speeches, both by Athenian and Spartan leaders, as well as debates between various parties. Of the speeches, the most famous is the funeral oration of Pericles, which is found in Book 2. Being an Athenian general in the war, Thucydides heard some of these speeches himself. For the other speeches, he relied on eyewitness accounts.

These speeches are suspect in the eyes of classicists, however, inasmuch as it is not clear to what degree Thucydides altered these speeches in order to elucidate better the crux of the argument presented. Some of the speeches are probably fabricated according to his expectations of, as he puts it, "what was called for in each situation" (1.22.1) and because in an era before audio recordings "it was in all cases difficult to carry them word for word in one’s memory."

=== Neutrality ===
Despite being an Athenian and a participant in the conflict, Thucydides is often regarded as having written a generally unbiased account of the conflict with respect to the sides involved in it. In the introduction to the piece he states, "my work is not a piece of writing designed to meet the taste of an immediate public, but was done to last for ever" (1.22.4).

There are scholars, however, who doubt this. Ernst Badian, for example, has argued that Thucydides has a strong pro-Athenian bias. In keeping with this sort of doubt, other scholars claim that Thucydides had an ulterior motive in his Histories, specifically to create an epic comparable to those of the past such as the works of Homer, and that this led him to create a nonobjective dualism favoring the Athenians. The work does display a clear bias against certain people involved in the conflict, such as Cleon.

=== Role of religion ===
The gods play no active role in Thucydides' work. This is very different from Herodotus, who frequently mentions the role of the gods, as well as a nearly ubiquitous divine presence in the centuries-earlier poems of Homer. Instead, Thucydides regards history as being caused by the choices and actions of human beings.

Despite the absence of actions of the gods, religion and piety play critical roles in the actions of the Spartans, and to a lesser degree, the Athenians. Thus natural occurrences such as earthquakes and eclipses were viewed as religiously significant (1.23.3, 7.50.4).

=== Rationalization of myth ===
Despite the absence of the gods from Thucydides' work, he still draws heavily from the Greek mythos, especially from Homer, whose works are prominent in Greek mythology. Thucydides references Homer frequently as a source of information, but always adds a distancing clause, such as "Homer shows this, if that is sufficient evidence," and "assuming we should trust Homer's poetry in this case too."

However, despite Thucydides' skepticism in secondhand information such as Homer's, he does use the poet's epics to infer facts about the Trojan War. For instance, while Thucydides considered the number of over 1,000 Greek ships sent to Troy to be a poetic exaggeration, he uses Homer's Catalogue of Ships to determine the approximate number of Greek soldiers who were present. Later, Thucydides claims that since Homer never makes reference to a united Greek state, the pre-Hellenic nations must have been so disjointed that they could not organize properly to launch an effective campaign. In fact, Thucydides claims that Troy could have been conquered in half the time had the Greek leaders allocated resources properly and not sent a large portion of the army on raids for supplies.

Thucydides makes sure to inform his reader that he, unlike Homer, is not a poet prone to exaggeration, but instead a historian, whose stories may not give "momentary pleasure," but "whose intended meaning will be challenged by the truth of the facts." By distancing himself from the storytelling practices of Homer, Thucydides makes it clear that while he does consider mythology and epics to be evidence, these works cannot be given much credibility, and that it takes an impartial and empirically minded historian, such as himself, to accurately portray the events of the past.

== Subject matter of the History ==
The first book of the History, after a brief review of early Greek history and some programmatic historiographical commentary, seeks to explain why the Peloponnesian War broke out when it did and what its causes were. Except for a few short excursuses (notably 6.54–6.58 on the Tyrant Slayers), the remainder of the History (Books 2–8) rigidly maintains its focus on the Peloponnesian War to the exclusion of other topics.

While the History concentrates on the military aspects of the Peloponnesian War, it uses these events as a medium to suggest several other themes closely related to the war. It specifically discusses in several passages the socially and culturally degenerative effects of war on humanity itself. The History is especially concerned with the lawlessness and atrocities committed by Greek citizens to each other in the name of one side or another in the war. Some events depicted in the History, such as the Melian dialogue, describe early instances of realpolitik or power politics. According to one scholar, there is a possibility that translation mistakes influenced the deductions of realists from the work of Thucydides.

The History is preoccupied with the interplay of justice and power in political and military decision-making. Thucydides' presentation is decidedly ambivalent on this theme. While the History seems to suggest that considerations of justice are artificial and necessarily capitulate to power, it sometimes also shows a significant degree of empathy with those who suffer from the exigencies of the war.

For the most part, the History does not discuss topics such as the art and architecture of Greece.

=== Military technology ===
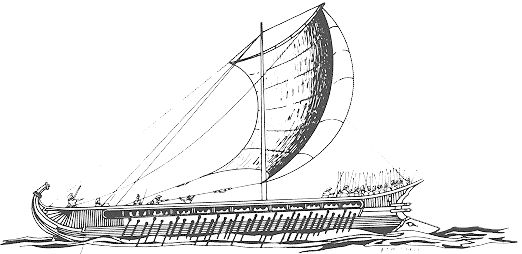
Illustration of a Greek trireme

The History emphasizes the development of military technologies. In several passages (1.14.3, 2.75–2.76, 7.36.2–3), Thucydides describes in detail various innovations in the conduct of siegeworks or naval warfare. The History places great importance upon naval supremacy, arguing that a modern empire is impossible without a strong navy. He states that this is the result of the development of piracy and coastal settlements in earlier Greece.

Important in this regard was the development, at the beginning of the classical period (c. 500 BC), of the trireme, the supreme naval ship for the next several hundred years. In his emphasis on sea power, Thucydides is echoed by the modern naval theorist Alfred Thayer Mahan, whose influential work The Influence of Sea Power upon History helped set in motion the naval arms race prior to World War I.

=== Empire ===
The History explains that the primary cause of the Peloponnesian War was the "growth in power of Athens, and the alarm which this inspired in Sparta" (1.23.6). Thucydides traces the development of Athenian power through the growth of the Athenian empire in the years 479 BC to 432 BC in book one of the History (1.89–1.118). The legitimacy of the empire is explored in several passages, notably in the speech at 1.73–1.78, where an anonymous Athenian legation defends the empire on the grounds that it was freely given to the Athenians and not taken by force. The subsequent expansion of the empire is defended by these Athenians, "...the nature of the case first compelled us to advance our empire to its present height; fear being our principal motive, though honor and interest came afterward" (1.75.3).

The Athenians also argue that, "We have done nothing extraordinary, nothing contrary to human nature in accepting an empire when it was offered to us and then in refusing to give it up" (1.76). They claim that anyone in their position would act in the same fashion. The Spartans represent a more traditional, circumspect, and less expansive power. Indeed, the Athenians are nearly destroyed by their greatest act of imperial overreach, the Sicilian expedition, described in books six and seven of the History.

=== Earth science ===
Thucydides correlates, in his description of the 426 BC Malian Gulf tsunami, for the first time in the recorded history of natural science, quakes and waves in terms of cause and effect.

== Some difficulties of interpretation ==
Thucydides' History is extraordinarily dense and complex. His particular ancient Greek prose is also very challenging, grammatically, syntactically, and semantically. This has resulted in much scholarly disagreement on a cluster of issues of interpretation.

=== Strata of composition ===
It is commonly thought that Thucydides died while still working on the History, since it ends in mid-sentence and only goes up to 411 BC, leaving six years of war uncovered. Furthermore, there is a great deal of uncertainty whether he intended to revise the sections he had already written. Since there appear to be some contradictions between certain passages in the History, it has been proposed that the conflicting passages were written at different times and that Thucydides' opinion on the conflicting matter had changed. Those who argue that the History can be divided into various levels of composition are usually called "analysts" and those who argue that the passages must be made to reconcile with one another are called "unitarians." This conflict is called the "strata of composition" debate. The lack of progress in this debate over the course of the twentieth century has caused many Thucydidean scholars to declare the debate insoluble and to side-step the issue in their work.

=== Sources ===
The History is notoriously reticent about its sources. Thucydides almost never names his informants and alludes to competing versions of events only a handful of times. This is in marked contrast to Herodotus, who frequently mentions multiple versions of his stories and allows the reader to decide which is true. Instead, Thucydides strives to create the impression of a seamless and irrefutable narrative. Nevertheless, scholars have sought to detect the sources behind the various sections of the History. For example, the narrative after Thucydides' exile (4.108ff) seems to focus on Peloponnesian events more than the first four books, leading to the conclusion that he had greater access to Peloponnesian sources at that time.

Frequently, Thucydides appears to assert knowledge of the thoughts of individuals at key moments in the narrative. Scholars have asserted that these moments are evidence that he interviewed these individuals after the fact. However, the evidence of the Sicilian Expedition argues against this, since Thucydides discusses the thoughts of the generals who died there and whom he would have had no chance to interview. Instead it seems likely that, as with the speeches, Thucydides is looser than previously thought in inferring the thoughts, feelings, and motives of principal characters in his History from their actions, as well as his own sense of what would be appropriate or likely in such a situation.

=== Critical evaluations ===
The historian J. B. Bury writes that the work of Thucydides "marks the longest and most decisive step that has ever been taken by a single man towards making history what it is today.”

Historian H. D. F. Kitto feels that Thucydides wrote about the Peloponnesian War not because it was the most significant war in antiquity but because it caused the most suffering. Indeed, several passages of Thucydides' book are written "with an intensity of feeling hardly exceeded by Sappho herself."

In his Open Society and Its Enemies, Karl R. Popper writes that Thucydides was the "greatest historian, perhaps, who ever lived." Thucydides' work, however, Popper goes on to say, represents "an interpretation, a point of view; and in this we need not agree with him." In the war between Athenian democracy and the "arrested oligarchic tribalism of Sparta," we must never forget Thucydides' "involuntary bias," and that "his heart was not with Athens, his native city”:

Although he apparently did not belong to the extreme wing of the Athenian oligarchic clubs who conspired throughout the war with the enemy, he was certainly a member of the oligarchic party, and a friend neither of the Athenian people, the demos, who had exiled him, nor of its imperialist policy.

— Popper (2012)

== Influence ==
Thucydides' History has been enormously influential in both ancient and modern historiography. It was embraced by many of the author's contemporaries and immediate successors with enthusiasm; indeed, many authors sought to complete the unfinished history. For example, Xenophon wrote his Hellenica as a continuation of Thucydides' work, beginning at the exact moment that Thucydides' History leaves off. In later antiquity, Thucydides' reputation suffered somewhat, with critics such as Dionysius of Halicarnassus rejecting the History as turgid and excessively austere. Lucian also parodies it (among others) in his satire The True Histories. US President Woodrow Wilson read the History on his voyage across the Atlantic to the Versailles Peace Conference.

In the 17th century, English philosopher Thomas Hobbes (who himself translated the work) wrote about Thucydides as follows:

It hath been noted by divers, that Homer in poesy, Aristotle in philosophy, Demosthenes in eloquence, and others of the ancients in other knowledge, do still maintain their primacy: none of them exceeded, some not approached, by any in these later ages. And in the number of these is justly ranked also our Thucydides; a workman no less perfect in his work, than any of the former; and in whom (I believe with many others) the faculty of writing history is at the highest.

— Thomas Hobbes, Thucydides 1628, p. 5

== Manuscripts ==
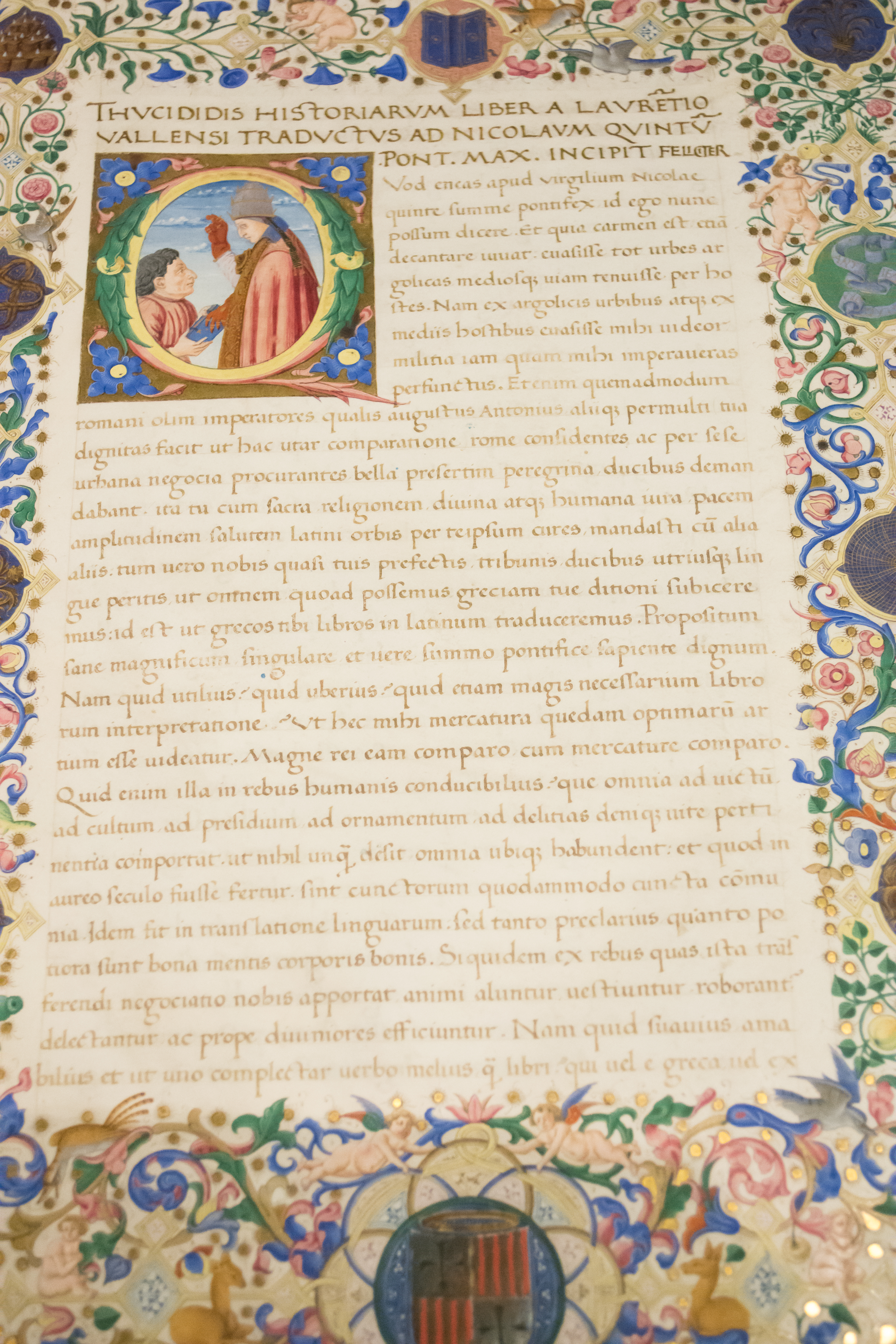
This manuscript is the Latin version translated (1450–1499) by Lorenzo Valla, decorated by Francesco di Antonio del Chierico, and dedicated to Pope Nicholas V

The most important manuscripts include: Parisinus suppl. Gr. 255, Vaticanus 126, Laurentianus Pluteus LXIX.2, Palatinus 252 (10th century, annotated and corrected by John Tzetzes in the 12th century), Monacensis 430, Monacensis 228, and Britannicus II, 727.

Grenfell and Hunt discovered about 20 papyrus fragments copied some time between the 1st and 6th centuries AD in Oxyrhynchus, including Papyrus Oxyrhynchus 16 and 17.

== Outline of the work ==
- Book 1
  - The state of Greece from the earliest times to the commencement of the Peloponnesian War, also known as the Archaeology. 1.1–1.19
  - Methodological excursus. 1.20–1.23
  - Causes of the war (433–432 BC). 1.24–1.66
    - The Affair of Epidamnus. 1.24–1.55
    - The Affair of Potidaea. 1.56–1.66
  - Congress of the Peloponnesian League at Lacedaemon. 1.67–1.88
    - The Speech of the Corinthians. 1.68–1.71
    - The Speech of the Athenian envoys. 1.73–1.78
    - The Speech of Archidamus. 1.80–1.85
    - The Speech of Sthenelaidas. 1.86
  - From the end of the Persian War to the beginning of the Peloponnesian War, also known as the Pentecontaetia. 1.89–1.117
    - The progress from supremacy to empire.
  - Second congress at Lacedaemon and the Corinthian Speech. 1.119–1.125
  - Diplomatic maneuvering. 1.126–1.139
    - Excursus on Cylon. 1.126–1.127
    - Excursus on Pausanias and Themistocles. 1.128–1.138
  - Pericles' first speech. 1.140–1.145
- Book 2 (431–428 BC)
  - War begins with Thebes' attempt to subvert Plataea. 2.1–2.6
  - Account of the mobilization of and list of the allies of the two combatants. 2.7–2.9
  - First invasion of Attica. 2.10–2.23
    - Archidamus leads the Peloponnesian army into Attica. 2.10–2.12
    - Athenian preparations and abandonment of the countryside. 2.13–2.14
    - Excursus on Athenian synoikism. 2.15–2.16
    - Difficult conditions in Athens for refugees from countryside. 2.17
    - Archidamus ravages Oenoe and Acharnai. 2.18–2.20
    - Athenian fury and anger at Pericles. 2.21–2.22
  - Athenian naval counterattacks along coast of Peloponnese and islands. 2.23–2.32
  - Pericles' Funeral Oration. 2.34–2.46
  - The plague of Athens. 2.47–2.54
  - Second invasion of Attica and Athenian naval counterattacks. 2.55–2.58
  - Pericles' third speech, defending his position and policy. 2.59–2.64
  - Thucydides' estimate of Pericles' qualities and the causes for Athens' eventual defeat. 2.65
  - Diplomacy and skirmishes in Thrace, the islands, and the Northeast. 2.66–2.69
  - Fall of Potidaea. 2.70
  - Investment of Plataea. 2.71–2.78
  - Naval victories of Phormio in the Northeast. 2.80–2.92
  - Threat of raid on the Piraeus. 2.93–2.94
  - Thracian campaign in Macedonia under Sitalces. 2.95–2.101
- Book 3 (428–425 BC)
  - Annual invasion of Attica. 3.1
  - Revolt of Mytilene. 3.2–3.50
    - Speech of Mytilenian envoys to Sparta at Olympia, asking for help. 3.9–3.14
    - Sparta accepts Lesbos as an ally and prepares to counter the Athenians. 3.15
    - Mytilene surrenders to Athens despite Spartan support. 3.28
    - Mytilenian Debate. 3.37–3.50
  - Fall of Plataea. 3.20–3.24, 3.52–3.68
    - Some Plataeans escape. 3.20–3.24
    - Plataea surrenders. 3.52
    - Trial and execution of the Plataeans. 3.53–3.68
      - Speech of Plataeans, 3.53–3.59
      - Speech of the Thebans. 3.61–3.67
  - Revolution at Corcyra. 3.70–3.85
    - Thucydides' account of the evils of civil strife. 3.82–3.84
  - Athenian campaigns in Sicily. 3.86, 3.90, 3.99, 3.103, 3.115–3.116
  - Tsunami and inquiry into its causes 3.89.2–5
  - Campaigns of Demosthenes in western Greece. 3.94–3.98, 3.100–3.102, 3.105–3.114
  - Spartans establish Heraclea in Trachis. 3.92–3.93
  - Athenians purify Delos. 3.104
- Book 4 (425–423 BC)
  - Annual invasion of Attica. 4.2
  - Athenians en route to Sicily occupy Pylos in the Peloponnese. 4.2–4.6
    - King Agis of Sparta cuts short the invasion of Attica to return to the Peloponnese. 4.6
  - Concerted Spartan attack on the Athenian fort at Pylos. 4.8–4.15
    - The Athenian general Demosthenes coordinates the defense of Pylos and rouses the troops with a speech. 4.9–4.10
    - The Spartan commander Brasidas distinguishes himself for bravery. 4.11–4.12
  - The Athenians defeat the Spartan assault on Pylos and cut off a garrison of Spartans on the adjacent island of Sphacteria. 4.13–4.14
  - The Spartans, concerned for the men on the island, conclude an immediate armistice and send an embassy to Athens to negotiate peace. 4.13–4.22
    - The speech of the Spartan ambassadors offers to peace and alliance to Athens in exchange for the return of the men on Sphacteria. 4.17–4.20
    - The Athenian Cleon, speaking in the Assembly, encourages the Athenians to demand the return of the territories surrendered by Athens at the conclusion of the First Peloponnesian War. 4.21–4.22
  - Events in Sicily. 4.24–4.25
  - Siege of the Spartans on Sphacteria continues without result. 4.26–4.27
  - Cleon takes command at Pylos. 4.27–4.29
  - Battle of Sphacteria results in the capture of all the Spartans trapped there. 4.29–4.41
  - Nicias leads an Athenian attack on Corinth. 4.42–4.45
  - End of Corcyraean revolution. 4.46–4.48
  - Athenians capture Cythera, an island off the Peloponnese, and Thyrea, a town in the Peloponnese. Sparta is hemmed in on all sides and desperate. 4.53–4.57
  - Sicilian cities make peace in conference at Gela, frustrating Athenian designs on the island. 4.58–4.65
    - Speech of Hermocrates at Gela. 4.59–4.64
  - Athenian attack on Megara. 4.66–4.74
    - Capture of Nisaea. 4.69
    - Inconclusive engagements at Megara. 4.73
    - Megara eludes Athenian capture. 4.74
  - Invasion of Boeotia. 4.76, 4.89–4.101.2
    - Battle of Delium results in Athenian retreat into a temple, which the Boeotians attack and burn down. 4.90–4.100
  - Brasidas marches through Thessaly to Thrace and begins to cause Athenian subject cities to revolt. 4.78–4.88
    - Speech of Brasidas to the Acanthians. 4.85–4.87
  - Fall of Amphipolis to Brasidas. 4.102–4.108
  - Continued successes of Brasidas in Thrace. 4.111–4.135
    - Brasidas secures the revolt of the garrison of Torone. 4.110–4.116
    - One–year armistice between Athenians and Spartans. 4.117–4.118
    - Scione revolts from Athens to Brasidas. 4.120–4.123
    - Truce breaks down. 4.122–4.123
    - Athenians retake Mende and besiege Scione. 4.129–4.131
- Book 5 (422–415 BC)
  - Death of Cleon and Brasidas. 5.10
  - Peace of Nicias. 5.13–5.24
  - Feeling against Sparta in the Peloponnese
  - League of the Mantineans, Eleans, Argives, and Athenians. 5.27–5.48
  - Battle of Mantinea and breaking up of the League. 5.63–5.81
  - The Melian Dialogue. 5.84–5.113
  - Fate of Melos. 5.116
- Book 6 (415–414 BC)
  - The Sicilian Expedition. 6.8–6.52
    - Early history of Sicily. 6.1–6.6
    - Speeches of Nicias and Alcibiades. 6.8–6.26
    - Affair of the Hermae. 6.27–6.29, 6.53
    - Departure of the expedition to Sicily. 6.30–6.32
    - Speeches of Hermocrates and Athenagoras at Syracuse. 6.33–6.41
    - Arrival of Athenians in Sicily. 6.42–6.52
  - Digression on Harmodius and Aristogiton. 6.53–6.58
  - Recall and flight of Alcibiades. 6.60–6.61
  - Athenian victory at Syracuse. 6.62–6.71
    - Debate between Hermocrates and Euphemus at Camarina. 6.72–6.88
  - Alcibiades at Sparta. 6.88–6.93
  - Athenian victories at Syracuse. 6.94–6.103
    - Spartans dispatch Gylippus to Sicily and clash with Athens at Argos. 6.104–6.105
- Book 7 (414–413 BC)
  - Arrival of Gylippus at Syracuse. 7.1–7.3
  - Fortification of Decelea. 7.19–7.3
  - Successes of the Syracusans
  - Arrival of Demosthenes
  - Defeat of the Athenians at Epipolae. 7.42–7.59
  - Folly and obstinacy of Nicias
  - Battles in the Great Harbour
  - Retreat and annihilation of the Athenian army. 7.72–7.87
- Book 8 (413–411 BC)
  - Disbelief and despair in Athens. 8.1
  - Allies revolt. 8.2–8.4
  - Persians offer support to Sparta. 8.5
  - Isthmian Festival. 8.9
  - Alcamenes. 8.10
  - Alcibiades encourages Endius to revolt. 8.12
  - Alcibiades encourages Chios to revolt. 8.14
  - Athens reverses law on reserve funds. 8.15
  - Sparta and Persian alliance. 8.18
  - Chians encourage revolt. 8.19
  - Samos commons overthrow upper classes. 8.21
  - Chians and Spartans v Athens and Argos; Ionians defeat Dorians. 8.25
  - Hermocrates prepares “finishing blow” to Athens, Alcibiades in Teichiussa. 8.26
  - Phrynichus; a “man of sense” retreats. 8.27
  - Tissaphernes distributes pay to Spartans. 8.29
  - The Spartan treaty with Persia. 8.37
  - Conflict between Pedaitus and Astyochus. 8.39
  - Slaves desert Chios. 8.40
  - Lichas tries to renegotiate treaty with Persia. The Spartans give not liberty but a “Median master” to the Greeks. 8.43
  - Rhodes revolts. 8.44
  - Astyochus is ordered to kill Alcibiades, who flees from Sparta to Tissaphernes. 8.45
  - Alcibiades advises Tissaphernes to let Athens and Sparta wear each other out. 8.46
  - Alcibiades plots his return to Athens. 8.47–8.48
  - Pissander to pave way for Alcibiades’ return. 8.49
  - Alcibiades betrays Phrynichus. 8.50
  - Phrynichus fortifies Samos. 8.51
  - Alcibiades encourages Tissaphernes to befriend Athens. 8.52
  - Pisander in Athens proposes deal: alliance with Persia, end of democracy, return of Alcibiades. 8.53–8.54
  - Athens defeats Chians, Pedaritus. 8.55
  - Alcibiades’ plans w/ Tissaphernes unravel. 8.56
  - Tissaphernes resolves to keep both sides equal, pays Sparta. 8.57
  - another treaty bet Persia and Sparta. 8.58–8.59
  - Pisander est. oligarchy in Athens, confusion in Samos. 8.63
  - Oligarchy in Athens, popular leaders are killed; “government of the 5,000.” 8.65
  - Oligarchy triumphant. 8.65
  - Popular party suspicious of each other. 8.66
  - Commissioners to frame a new constitution = tyranny of the 400. 8.67
  - Pisander, Phrynichus, Theramenes = leaders of the oligarchy. 8.68
  - The 400 with daggers dismiss the council (Boule). 8.69
  - Oligarchs offer to make peace with Sparta. 8.70
  - Spartan forces move to Athens’ walls. Oligarchs again offer peace w/ Sparta. 8.71
  - Seamen at Samos reject oligarchy. 8.72
  - Turmoil at Samos, the Athenian crews est democracy, kill 30 oligarchs. 8.73
  - Exaggerated report at Samos of horrors at Athens. 8.74
  - Thrasybullus and Thrasyllus leaders of the democratic faction in Samos. 8.75
  - The army replaces oligarchy in Samos, Alcibiades promises alliance with Persia. 8.76
  - Debate in Samos. 8.77
  - Pelop soldiers anxious to fight, Astyochus unwilling to fight at sea. Tissaphernes fleet never arrives. 8.78
  - Athenians reinforced, Pelop unwilling to fight. 8.79
  - Revolt of Byzantium. 8.80
  - Alcibiades recalled, promises Persian aid. 8.81
  - Alcibiades elected general, “put all their affairs in his hands.” 8.82
  - Tissaphernes fails to pay Spartan soldiers. 8.83
  - Pelop sailors threaten Astyochus, who is recalled and replaced by Mindarus. 8.84
  - Hermocrates is banished from Syracuse, he opposes Sparta’s alliance with Persia. 8.85
  - Alcibiades prevents Samian soldiers’ attack on Athens, calls for end to the 400. 8.86
  - Tissaphernes/Persia continues policy of letting Athens and Sparta wear each other out. 8.87
  - Alcibiades knew Tissaphernes would never send ships to support Sparta. 8.88
  - Oligarchs in Athens break ranks, Thermenes and Aristocrates fear Alcibiades power in Samos. 8.89
  - Phrynichus, Aristarchus, Pisander, and Antiphon most opposed to Democracy, again appeal to Sparta. Fortify the Piraeus. 8.90
  - The oligarchs’ plans. 8.91
  - The oligarchy collapses. 8.92
  - Oligarchs and soldiers meet on Acropolis and agree to reforms. 8.93
  - Pelop ships appear. 8.94
  - Pelop ships defeat Athenians, Euboea revolts. 8.95
  - Athens despairs. “Lacedaemonians proved the most convenient people in the world for the Athenians to be at war with.” 8.96
  - The 400 are deposed, the 5000 the “best government” in Thuc's lifetime. A “hoplite democracy,” no pay for public service (i.e. no thetes). 8.97
  - Pisander and Alexicles withdraw to Decelea, Aristarchus takes barbarian archers to Oenoe. The oligarchy is over. 8.98
  - Thrasybulus and Thrasyllus victory at sea renews Athens’ hope. 8.103–8.106
  - Alcibiades returns. 8.108
  - Abrupt ending of the history. 8.109

== Selected translations ==
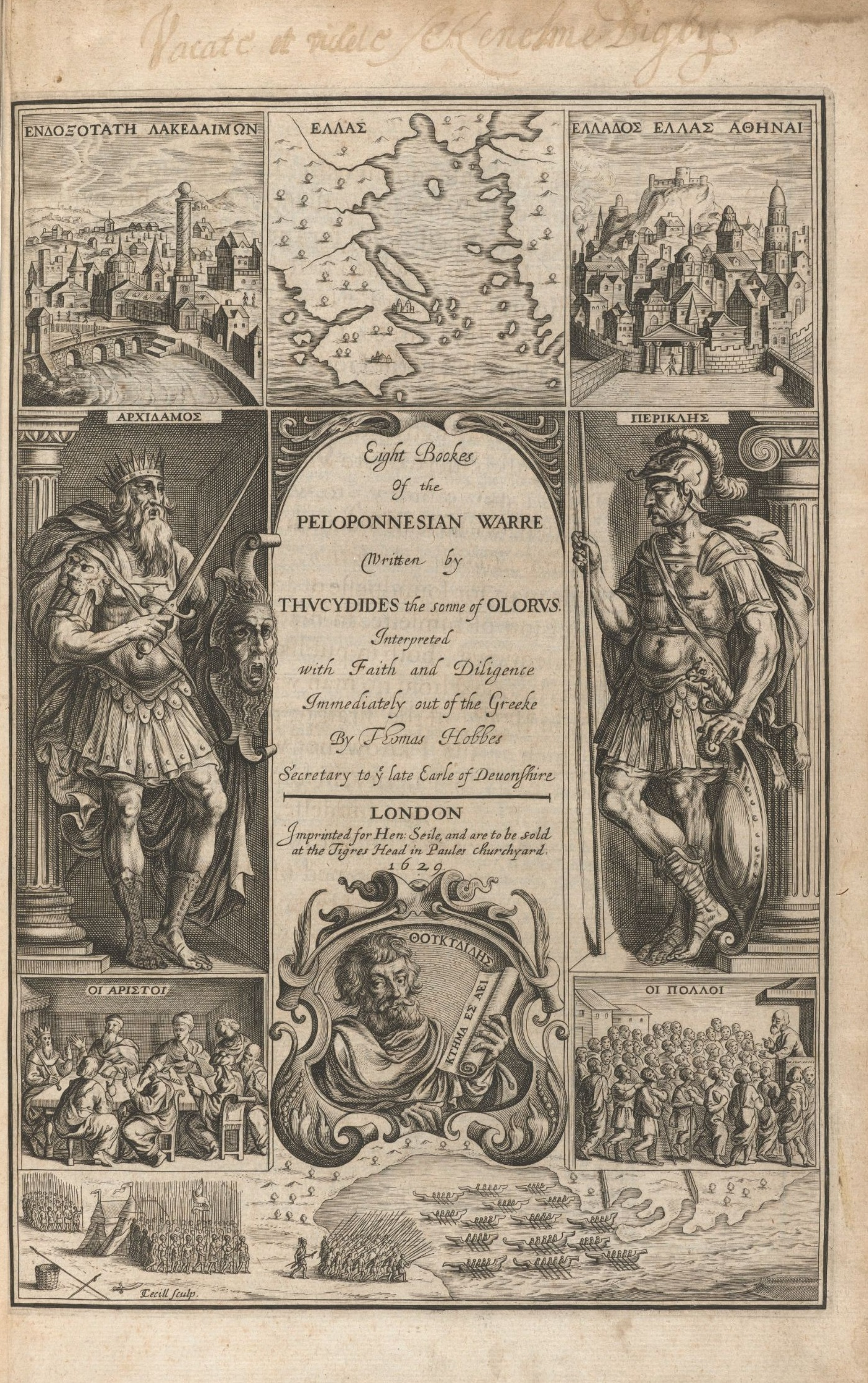
Title page to a translation by Thomas Hobbes

- Laurentius Valla, Treviso: J. Rubeus Vercellensis, 1483
- Thomas Nichols, 1550
- Thomas Hobbes, 1628 – Full text
- William Smith, 1753
- Johann David Heilmann, 1760
- Richard Crawley, 1874 – Full text
- Benjamin Jowett, 1881 – Full text
- Edgar C. Marchant, 1900
- Charles Forster Smith, 1919–1923 (Loeb)
- Rex Warner, 1954
- John H. Finley, Jr., 1963
- Walter Blanco, 1998
- Steven Lattimore, 1998
- Bryn Mawr review of Lattimore's translation, which discusses the other major translations as well
- Martin Hammond, 2009
- Jeremy Mynott, 2013

== See also ==
- Thucydides
- History of war
- Papyrus Oxyrhynchus 17

== Bibliography ==
Referenced

- Badian, Ernst (1990). "Thucydides and the Outbreak of the Peloponnesian War: A Historian's Brief". In Allison, June (ed.). Conflict, Antithesis and the Ancient Historian. Columbus: Ohio State University Press. pp. 46–91.
- Brands, H. W. (2003). Schlesinger, Arthur M. (ed.). Woodrow Wilson. The American Presidents Series. Times Books. ISBN 978-0-8050-6955-6.
- Bury, J. B. (1958). The Ancient Greek Historians. New York: Dover Publications. p. 147.
- Bury, J. B. (1975). A History of Greece (4th ed.). New York: Modern Library. p. 252.
- Bowker, Stan (1966). "Kitto At BC". The Heights. XLVI (16).
- Connor, W. Robert (1984). Thucydides. Princeton: Princeton University Press. ISBN 0-691-03569-5.
- Dover, K. J. (1983). "Thucydides 'as History' and 'as Literature'". History and Theory. 22 (1): 54–63. doi:10.2307/2505236.
- Eckstein, Arthur M. (2003). "Thucydides, the Outbreak of the Peloponnesian War, and the Foundation of International Systems Theory". The International History Review. 25 (4): 757–774. doi:10.1080/07075332.2003.9641012. ISSN 0707-5332. JSTOR 40110357. S2CID 154821198.
- Graziosi, Barbara (2002). Inventing Homer: The Early Reception of Epic. Cambridge University Press. ISBN 0-521-80966-5.
- Jordan, Borimir (1986). "Religion in Thucydides". Transactions of the American Philological Association. 116: 119–147. doi:10.2307/283914. JSTOR 283914.
- Kagan, Donald (1975). "The Speeches in Thucydides and the Mytilene Debate". Yale Classical Studies. 24: 71–94. doi:10.1017/CBO9780511933769.006.
- Luzzatto, M. J. (1999). Tzetzes lettore di Tucidide. Note autografe dal Palatino greco 252 (in Italian). Bari: Dedalo. ISBN 978-88-220-5801-0.
- Morley, Neville; Lee, Christine (2014). "Introduction: Reading Thucydides". A Handbook to the Reception of Thucydides. John Wiley & Sons. pp. 1–4. ISBN 978-1-4051-9691-8. OCLC 999625055.
- "Peloponnesian". Dictionary.com Unabridged. Dictionary.com. n.d.
- Popper, Karl (2012). The Open Society and Its Enemies. Routledge. ISBN 978-1-136-70025-5.
- Rusten, Jeffrey S. (2023). "Prolegomena to the Peloponnesian War: Thucydides Book 1". In Low, Polly (ed.). The Cambridge Companion to Thucydides. Cambridge University Press. pp. 77–88. doi:10.1017/9781316227442.008. ISBN 978-1-107-10705-2.
- Saïd, Suzanne (30 July 2015). "Homer". Oxford Research Encyclopedia of Classics. doi:10.1093/acrefore/9780199381135.013.3138. ISBN 978-0-19-938113-5.
- Smid, T. C. (April 1970). "Tsunamis in Greek Literature". Greece & Rome. Second Series. 17 (1): 100–104. doi:10.1017/S0017383500017393.
- Strauss, Leo (1974). "Preliminary Observations on the Gods in Thucydides' Work". Interpretation: A Journal of Political Philosophy. 4: 11–16.
- Westlake, H. D. (2010). Individuals in Thucydides. Cambridge University Press. ISBN 978-0-521-14753-8.

Additional literature

- Crane, Gregory (1998). Thucydides and the Ancient Simplicity: The Limits of Political Realism. Berkeley: University of California Press.
- Hornblower, Simon (1987). Thucydides. London: Duckworth. ISBN 0-7156-2156-4.
- Hornblower, Simon (1991). A Commentary on Thucydides. Vol. I: Books I - III. Oxford: Clarendon Press. ISBN 0-19-815099-7.
- Hornblower, Simon (1996). A Commentary on Thucydides. Vol. II: Books IV-V. 24. Oxford: Clarendon Press. ISBN 0-19-927625-0.
- Orwin, Clifford (1994). The Humanity of Thucydides. Princeton: Princeton University Press. ISBN 0-691-03449-4.
- Pade, Marianne (2003). "Thucydides" (PDF). In Brown, Virginia (ed.). Catalogus Translationum et Commentariorum: Mediaeval and Renaissance Latin Translations and Commentaries. Vol. 8. Washington, DC: Catholic University of America Press. pp. 103–181. ISBN 978-0-8132-1300-2.
- de Romilly, Jacqueline (1988) [1963]. Thucydides and Athenian Imperialism [Thucydide et l'impérialisme athénien]. Morals and Law in Ancient Greece. Translated by Thody, Philip. Salem, NH: Ayer Company Publishers. ISBN 0-88143-072-2.
- Rood, Tim (1998). Thucydides: Narrative and Explanation. Oxford: Oxford University Press. ISBN 0-19-927585-8.
- Strassler, Robert B. (1996). The Landmark Thucydides: A Comprehensive Guide to the Peloponnesian War. New York: Free Press. ISBN 0-684-82815-4.

Translations of "History of the Peloponnesian War"

- Thucydides (1628). Eight Bookes of the Peloponnesian Warre. Translated by Hobbes, Thomas (First English translation ed.). London.
- —— (1819). Thucydidis, Olori fil., De bello peloponnesiaco libri VIII (in Latin). London: Versione Latina.
- —— (1874). History of the Peloponnesian War. Translated by Crawley, Richard. London: Longmans, Green, and Co.
  - History of the Peloponnesian War, translated by Richard Crawley at Standard Ebooks
- —— (1881). Thucydides translated into English; with introduction, marginal analysis, notes, and indices. Translated by Jowett, Benjamin. Oxford: Clarendon Press. Archived from the original on 11 December 2016.
- —— (1954). History of the Peloponnesian War. Translated by Warner, Rex. London: Penguin Books.
- —— (11 June 2009). Hammond, Martin; Rhodes, P. J (eds.). The Peloponnesian War. Oxford World's Classics. Translated by Hammond, Martin. Oxford: Oxford University Press. ISBN 978-0-19-282191-1.
