= Al-Mnaykhrat =

Ancient Greek rock tomb in Libya

Coordinates: 32°27.67′N 20°55.24′E

Al-Mnaykhrat or Mnechret (Arabic: منخرال) is a late sixth-century BC Greek rock-tomb near Marj, in northeastern Libya.

== Description ==
The tomb is cut into a cliff on the west side of the Wadi Taybsillu, southeast of the city of Marj (ancient Barca). It is clearly visible across the surrounding plain and must have been built for a high-ranking individual, but there is no evidence regarding their identity. The structure is dated to the late sixth century BC on stylistic grounds.

The tomb is about 2.15 metres above the ground level. There is a clear open area in front of the tomb, measuring The façade is 5.32 metres high and consists of two stories: a bottom story which is 2.81 metes high and consists two low walls (0.56-0.75 m high), on top of which are two broad Doric columns, which are 0.60-0.84 m wide and 1.5-1.65 m high. Above this is a 0.72 metre-high architrave and a 0.30 metre high cornice. The top story is 2.22 metres high and has three narrow Ionic or Aeolic columns, which are 1.83 metres tall. Above this is a 0.30 metre high architrave.

The lower level leads into an irregular, trapezoidal outer chamber, which is 5.2-5.85 metres wide and 2.5-3.25 metres deep. The walls are lined with seven stone benches (klinai), one on each of the side walls, two on the outer wall and three on the inner wall. This space was used for ritual feasting. Some of the tombs in the northern necropolis at Cyrene have similar chambers. A doorway above the middle bench on the inner wall leads into a roughly square inner chamber, measuring 3.65-5.2 x 2.8-3.0 metres. There is a recess on the right side for the body of the deceased. It is 0.54 metres above floor level, 1.9 metres long, 1.46 metres high, and 1.20 metres deep. The upper level leads to a separate chamber the same size as the outer chamber below it, which is totally empty. There is no connection between the two levels and the upper floor is only accessible with difficulty; it was probably decorative.

The modern name of the tomb "al-Mnaykhrat" has been interpreted as a corrupted form of the Greek name Menecrates, but it is actually Libyan Arabic for "nostrils", since it looks from a distance like a set of nostrils in the side of the hill.

Archaeological investigations of the tomb were undertaken by the archaeologist Maria Grazia Pierini in the late 1960s.

== Bibliography ==
- Pierini, Maria Grazia (1971). "La tomba di "Menecrate" a Barce in Cirenaica". Quaderni di Archeologia della Libia. 6: 23–30.
- Vickers, M. J.; Reynolds, J. M. (1971–1972). "Cyrenaica, 1962-72". Archaeological Reports. 18: 27–47. doi:10.2307/581070. ISSN 0570-6084. JSTOR 581070.
- Kenrick, Philip M. (2013). Cyrenaica. London: Silphium Press. pp. 109–110. ISBN 9781900971140.
