= Decimus Cascellius Aristoteles =

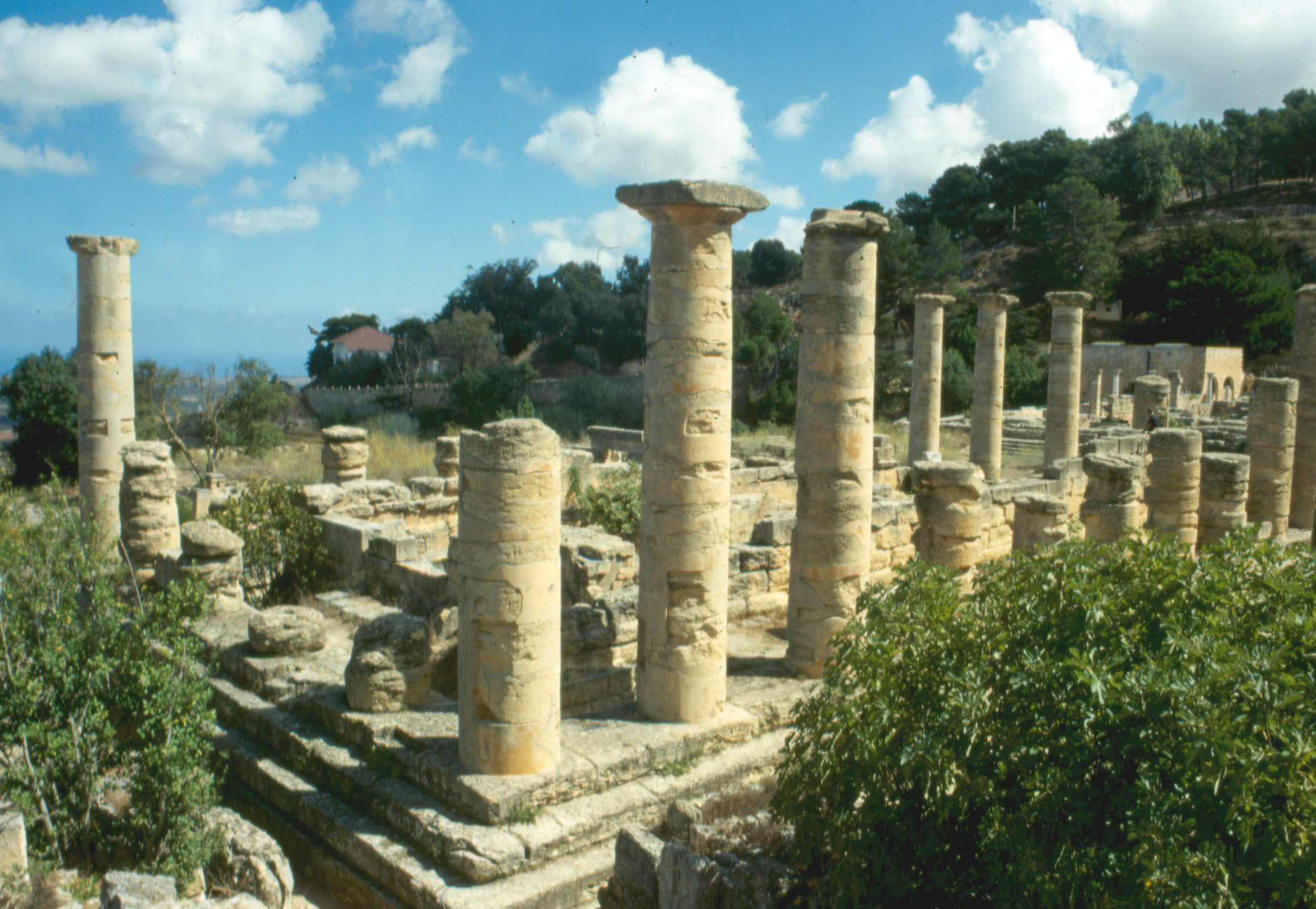
The Temple of Apollo, Cyrene, which was reconsecrated by Aristoteles.

Decimus Cascellius Aristoteles (Ancient Greek: Δέκμος Κασκέλλιος Ἀριστοτέλης, romanized: Dekmos Kaskellios Aristotelēs) was a leading statesman of Cyrene in the mid-second century AD.

Aristoteles belonged to a family that had long been prominent in Cyrene, perhaps descended from the Italian negotiatores (businessmen) who settled in the Eastern Mediterranean in the second century BC. Members of the family are attested as prominent Cyrenaean officials from 68 AD until the early third century AD.

Aristoteles played a prominent role in the recovery of the city following its devastation in the Kitos War in 115 AD. He was among the benefactors who donated money to "mother Cyrene" to aid the rebuilding efforts during the reign of Hadrian. He was one of several aristocrats who sponsored a column as part of the project to rebuild the Temple of Apollo (IRCyr C.256). The reconstruction of the temple was completed in the reign of Commodus, when Aristoteles was an old man and the Cyrenaeans appointed him annual priest of Apollo in order to reconsecrate the temple. This act is commemorated by two inscriptions near the temple, one in prose (IRCyr C.250) and the other (SEG 9.189) an inscribed epigram which compares him to Battus Aristoteles, the legendary founder of Cyrene:

καὶ πρότερόν σοι, Φοῖβε, τεὸν δωμήσατο νηὸν
Θήρης ἐκπεμφθεὶ̣ς Βάττος Ἀριστοτέλης·
καὶ νῦν ἐκ πολέμοιο χαμαιριφῆ Ἀπόλλωνι
στῆσεν ὑπ’ εὐσεβίης νηὸν Ἀριστοτέλης.

—SEG 9.189, Spawforth & Walker 1986, pp. 97–98.

And, formerly, for you, Phoebus, a temple was built,
by Battus Aristoteles, sent out from Thera,
and, now, when it was thrown to the ground by war, for Apollo,
a temple was erected out of piety, by Aristoteles.

Aristoteles also helped renew ties between Cyrene and its mother-city, Sparta, which had not been in close contact since the mid-Hellenistic period. As part of this, he served as the patronomos (chief magistrate) of Sparta.

== Bibliography ==
- Spawforth, A. J.; Walker, Susan (1986). "The World of the Panhellenion: II. Three Dorian Cities". The Journal of Roman Studies. 76: 88–105. doi:10.2307/300367. ISSN 0075-4358. JSTOR 300367.
- Robert, Louis (1960). Hellenica: Recueil d'épigraphie de numismatique et d'antiquités grecques XI-XII.
