= Priest of Apollo (Cyrene) =

Chief priesthood of Ancient Cyrene

The priest of Apollo (Ancient Greek: ἱαρεὺς τοῦ Ἀπόλλωνος, romanized: hiareus tou Apollōnos) was the chief priesthood of Ancient Cyrene from the fifth century BC until the third century AD.

The priesthood was held for one year. According to the constitution of Cyrene issued by Ptolemy I in 322 BC, the priest had to be chosen from among the 101 members of the council of elders and had to be over the age of fifty. The priesthood was a highly symbolic role, acting as the chief representative of the city to the gods. The office was highly sought after by members of the Cyrenaean elite.

The priest was required to host several public banquets and carry out sacrifices at his own expense. The priest was the city's eponymous official, meaning that his name was used to date all civic documents produced during his year in office. Some priests also carried out building work within the sanctuary of Apollo. After his year in office the priest became a kind of "elder statesman" with privileged rights to attend various banquets and sacrifices.

== List of priests of Apollo at Cyrene ==
The dates and details for the priests of the 5th-1st centuries BC derive from Rosamilia 2023, pp. 99–106; IGCyr refers to the Inscriptions of Greek Cyrenaica (available here); IRCyr refers to the Inscriptions of Roman Cyrenaica (available here).

Name	Date	Primary source	Note
Philon	End of 5th century BC	IGCyr 81200, l. 2	
Philocomus	End of 5th century BC	IGCyr 81100, l. 2-3	
Hermesander	End of 5th century BC	IGCyr 81100, l. 9, 25 l. 3	Immediate successor of Philocomus
Philecis	ca. 390-370 BC	IGCyr 81200, l. 4	
Anaxander	ca. 390-370 BC	IGCyr 81200, l. 5	
Agonis son of Timocles	ca. 390-370 BC	IGCyr 81200, l. 1, 6, 10	Last priest named on 25
Ca[rtisthen]es son of Mnasias	ca. 365-350 BC	IGCyr 12500	From a family of Olympic victors
Unknown	ca. 360-350 BC	IGCyr 20800	His name was subsequently erased on IGCyr 20800 and replaced with that of Melanippus
Melanippus son of Aristander	ca. 350-340 BC	IGCyr 12400, 101700 and 20800	
Eumelidas	ca. 350 BC	IGCyr 20900	Probably buried at Ain Hofra
[Theuchres]tus son of Polytimus	ca. 350 BC	IGCyr 88100	Also served as general
Iasis	ca. 345 BC	IGCyr 12200	
Unknown son of [Po]lyanthes	ca. 345-338 BC	IGCyr 14800, ll. 3-4	
-os son of Chi-	Before 337 BC	IGCyr 11700	
-s son of A-	ca. 337 BC	IGCyr 94800	
Iason son of Xouthos	ca. 336 BC	IGCyr 94800	
Philothales son of Iason	ca. 335 BC	IGCyr 94800, 90	Built the fountain northwest of the temple of Apollo
Epigenes son of Epitimidas	ca. 334 BC	IGCyr 94800	
Cletomach[os]	ca. 333 BC	IGCyr 94800	
Theochres[tus]	ca. 332 BC	IGCyr 94800	
Sthen[on]	ca. 331 BC	IGCyr 94800	Also served as nauarch
Timonax son of Agis	ca. 330 BC	IGCyr 94800, 11500	
Sosias son of Calliadas	ca. 327-324 BC	IGCyr 10900	
Peithagoras son of Anniceris	323-320 BC	IGCyr 10800	Served three terms in the period culminating in Ptolemy I's conquest of Cyrene; possibly spent those years in exile in Alexandria
Unknown son of -as	ca. 330-300 BC	IGCyr. 98400	Built a fountain or stoa
Unknown	ca. 330-300 BC	IGCyr 22100	
Bathycles	ca. 330-315 BC	IGCyr 13000	
Euthycles son of Paraebatas	ca. 315 BC	IGCyr 11600	His son also served as priest of Apollo
Ba[cal] son of Aeglanor	ca. 305-290 BC	IGCyr 92000	Also served as nomophylax
Praxiadas son of Eu[cleidas]	ca. 300-290 BC	IGCyr 12700, 98200	Built the Greek Propylon in the sanctuary of Apollo; his son may also have served as priest
Elaeitas son of [Theudor]us	ca. 300-290 BC	IGCyr 80500	Built the Seat of Elaeitas in the sanctuary of Apollo; his son and grandson also served as priest
Magas	ca. 290-280 BC	IGCyr 63900	Subsequently, ruled Cyrene as governor (303-276) and king (276-250)
Hiarocles	ca. 300-270 BC	IGCyr 9420	
Unknown son of Elaeitas	ca. 275 BC	IGCyr 127800	His father and his son or nephew also served as priests of Apollo
Unknown son of Philocomus	ca. 290-260 BC	IGCyr 22900	
Iason son of Hippis	ca. 290-260 BC	IGCyr 95200	
Nicobolus son of Iason	ca. 270 BC	IGCyr 65200	Subsequently, also priest of King Magas
Unknown son of Hagesagoras	ca. 270 BC		Identification as priest of Apollo uncertain
Cleuthemis son of Stasis	ca. 270-260 BC	IGCyr 65200, 93	
Mnasarchus son of Theuchrestus	ca. 270-260 BC	IGCyr 98000	
Cletomachus son of Praxiadas	ca. 270-260 BC	IGCyr 111100	His father may also have served as priest.
Philinus son of Philinus	ca. 270-260 BC	IGCyr 9200, 13400	Sometimes dated ca. 300 BC, but linguistic and palaeographical features of the inscription in which he is named suggest a similar date to Mnasarchus and Cletomachus.
Poly-	ca. 265-259 or 255	55	Perhaps identical with the unknown son of Eucles
Unknown son of Eucles	ca. 259 BC	IGCyr 96700	Perhaps identical with Poly- above
-staphan son of Itagus	ca. 258 BC	IGCyr 96700	
-opus son of Polemarchus	ca. 257 BC	IGCyr 96700	
Elaeitas II son of Theudorus	ca. 256 BC	IGCyr 96700	His grandson and father or uncle also served as priests
[Pol]ydorus son of Polyanthes	ca. 255 BC	IGCyr 96700	
Nautas son of Eumelidas	ca. 254 BC	IGCyr 96700	
[I]ason son of Biander	ca. 253 BC	IGCyr 96700	
[Po]seidis son of Theudorus	ca. 252 BC	IGCyr 96700	
[Eu]tychus son of Heracleitus	ca. 251 BC	IGCyr 96700	Possibly appointed by Ptolemy III and probably not Cyrenaean.
Glaucon son of Eteocles	ca. 250 BC	IGCyr 96700	Ptolemaic appointee from Athens, brother of Chremonides.
[Etone]us son of Etoneus	ca. 249 BC	IGCyr 96700	Ptolemaic appointee from the court at Alexandria, distantly related to Pelops, son of Pelops, governor of Cyprus (217-203 BC).
Unknown son of Nicanor	ca. 248 BC	IGCyr 96700	
Unknown son of -toboulus	ca. 247 BC	IGCyr 96700	
Unknown son of Zoelus	ca. 246-230 BC	IGCyr 127500	His father was probably also priest
[Timonoth]us son of Com[atas]	ca. 246-220 BC	IGCyr 98100	
Unknown name	ca. 230-200 BC	IGCyr 130300	
Aristis son of Theudorus	ca. 230-200 BC	IGCyr 21000	
Unknown son of [Cha]res	ca. 230-200 BC	IGCyr 64200	The inscription that mentions him was found at Apollonia, so he may have been priest there, rather than at Cyrene. The father's name suggests an Athenian origin.
Unknown son of -es	ca. 230-200 BC	IGCyr 125600	
Andreas	ca. 200 BC	IGCyr 15200	
Alexander	ca. 220-180 BC	IGCyr 20400	
Philoxenus	ca. 200 BC	IGCyr 98500	The inscription is fragmentary; Philoxenus may actually be the priest's patronymic
Hagesistratus son of Po-	ca. 220-200 BC	IGCyr 95150, 14300	The patronymic might be Po[lon] or Po[lyanthes]
...nto.	ca. 200 BC	IGCyr 98300	
Unknown son of -phanes	ca. 220-170 BC	IGCyr 95300	
[Bac]al son of -enes	3rd century BC?	IGCyr 97850	
Unknown name	ca. 220-180 BC	IGCyr 18900	The inscription's traces include the name Aris[toteles] son of So[sis] (see below), but he may not be named here as priest.
[Eu]anthes son of [Eu]phris	ca. 220-180 BC	IGCyr 108700	
Ptolemy VIII	163-145 BC	Athenaeus, Deipnosophistae 12.73, quoting Ptolemy's autobiography	Ptolemy held the office at some point during his period as ruler of Cyrene.
A-	139-132 BC	IGCyr 11100	
Aristoteles son of Sosis	ca. 140-100 BC	IGCyr 86400	
Melanippus	ca. 96-90 BC	Plutarch, Moralia 255e-257e	Killed by the tyrant Nicocrates, who took the position for himself.
Nicocrates	ca. 96-85 BC	Plutarch, Moralia 255e-257e	Ruled Cyrene as tyrant until murdered by his wife Aretaphila. He may have held the priesthood for several years.
Alexander	ca. 100 BC	IRCyr M.164	
Asclapus son of Asclapus	ca. 100-50 BC	IRCyr C.269	
Ca-	67 BC	IRCyr C.688	An alternative dating of 75 BC is less likely.
[A]rimman son of Arimman	1st century BC?	IRCyr C.259	Dedicated a structure of some kind during his priesthood. Perhaps also served as gymnasiarch
Dam-	1st century BC	IRCyr C.294	
Eubates	1st century BC	IRCyr C.94	
Poseidonius	1st century BC	IRCyr C.93, 308	
Clesippus	1st century BC	IRCyr C.701	
Eucles son of Aeglanor	ca. 50-1 BC	IRCyr C.148	
Barcaeus son of Theuchrestus	ca. 20 BC	IRCyr C.276	Also served as eponymous priest of Augustus in 17/16 BC
Panta[leon]	ca. 15-1 BC	IRCyr C.276, l. 5	His son was also priest
Barcaeus son of Euphanes	18/17 BC	IRCyr C.140	
Philiscus son of Euphanes, but by birth of Euphanes	17/16 BC	IRCyr C.95, C.140	
-r son of Philinnas	ca. 1-14 AD	IRCyr C.756	
Pausanias son of Philiscus, but by birth of Euphanes	2/3 AD	Greek Verse Inscriptions of Cyrenaica 27	Priest at the end of the Marmaric War; his brother also served as priest.
Aristarchus son of Theuchrestus	ca. 10-18 AD	IRCyr C.48	
Theuchrestus son of Dionysius	ca. 19 AD?	IRCyr C.48	
Phaus son of Clearchus	ca. 19-30 AD	IRCyr C.48	
Istrus son of Agathinus	ca. 19-30 AD	IRCyr C.48	His son also served as priest
Asclepiades son of Epicrates	ca. 19-30 AD	IRCyr C.48	
Euphanes son of Isocrates	ca. 19-30 AD	IRCyr C.48	
Pantaleon son of Pantaleon	ca. 19-30 AD	IRCyr C.48	
Isocrates son of Anchistratus	ca. 19-30 AD	IRCyr C.48	
Philoxenus son of Philiscus, but by birth of Euphanes	ca. 19-30 AD	IRCyr C.48	His brother also served as priest
Aeglanor son of Ptolemaeus	ca. 19-30 AD	IRCyr C.48	
Phaus son of Carnedas	ca. 19-30 AD	IRCyr C.48	
Philippus son of Aristander	ca. 19-30 AD	IRCyr C.48	
Clearchus son of Euphanes	ca. 19-30 AD	IRCyr C.48	
Istrus son of Istrus son of Euphanes	ca. 19-30 AD	IRCyr C.48	His father also served as priest
Praxiadas son of Praxaiadas son of Philinnas	ca. 19-30 AD	IRCyr C.48	
Eucleidas son of Eucleidas son of Eucleidas	ca. 19-30 AD	IRCyr C.48	
Serapion son of Aristander	ca. 19-30 AD	IRCyr C.48	
Zenion son of Sosis	ca. 19-30 AD	IRCyr C.48	
Clearchus son of Carnedas	ca. 19-30 AD	IRCyr C.48	
Marcus Clearchus son of Flamma Isocrates	ca. 19-30 AD	IRCyr C.48	His brother also served as priest
Lucius Carnedas son of Flamma Isocrates	ca. 19-30 AD	IRCyr C.48	His brother also served as priest
Marcus Antonius Cerealis Aeglanor son of Ptolemaeus son of Ptolemaeus son of Ptolemaeus son of Ptolemaeus	ca. 65/6 AD	IRCyr C.49, 265	
Metrodorus son of Metrodorus son of Metrodorus	ca. 66/7 AD	IRCyr C.49, 265	
Tiberius Claudius Archippus son of Archippus	67/8 AD	IRCyr C.49, 265	
Marcus Antonius Cascellius son of Flamma	68/9 AD	IRCyr C.49, 265	
Sotas son of Dionysius	1st century AD	IRCyr C.49	
Quintus Favius Philippus son of Philiscus	70/71 AD	IRCyr C.265	
Anchistratus son of Cartisthenes	1st century AD	IRCyr C.33, C.219, C.393	
Tiberius Claudius Pancles son of Serapion	1st century AD	IRCyr C.33, C.49, C.219, C.393	
Marcus Antonius Gemellus son of Flamma	1st century AD	IRCyr. C.219	
Tiberius Claudius Priscus son of Apollonius	1st century AD	IRCyr. C.219	
Tiberius Claudius Aristander son of Aristarchus	1st century AD	IRCyr. C.219	
Tiberius Claudius Istrus son of Philiscus	1st century AD	IRCyr C.219, C.393	
Tiberius Claudius Asclapus son of Philiscus	1st century AD	IRCyr C.219, C.393	
Marcus Asinius Euphranor son of Philon	1st century AD	IRCyr C.219, C.393	
Tiberius Claudius Carnedas son of Clearchus	1st century AD	IRCyr C.219, C.393	
Tiberius Claudius Philiscus son of Istrus	75/6 AD	IRCyr C.219	
Tiberius Claudius Asclepiades son of Epicrates	1st century AD?	IRCyr. C.260	
Tiberius Claudius Istrus son of Pheidimus	100/101 AD	IRCyr C.263	
Tiberius Claudius Attalus son of Clearchus	102/103 AD	IRCyr. C.223	
Titus Flavius Eucleidas son of Battus	103/104 AD	IRCyr. C.223	
Tiberius Claudius Philoxenus Antonianus	104/105 AD	IRCyr. C.223	
Gaius Postumius Optatus	106/107 AD	IRCyr. C.223	
Rutilius	107/108 AD	IRCyr. C.223	
Publius Sestius Pollio	111/112 AD		Also served as a Roman Senator, Quaestor, Curule Aedile, and governor of the province of Crete and Cyrenaica
Titus Flavius Pausanias	1st-2nd century AD	IRCyr C.394	
-as son of Ptolemaeus	1st-2nd century AD	IRCyr C.394	
Ptolemaeus son of Ptolemaeus	1st-2nd century AD	IRCyr C.394	
Tiberius Claudius Ap-	148/149 AD	IRCyr C.264	
Marcus C- Ancharenus	ca. 160-180 AD	IRCyr C.267	
Publius Claudius Torquatus	ca. 160-180 AD	IRCyr C.267	His cognomen may be a misreading for Barcaeus.
"The City"	ca. 160-180 AD	IRCyr C.267	Apparently no individual was willing/capable of undertaking the priesthood and the expense was instead undertaken in this year by the city of Cyrene. This is a common phenomenon throughout the Greek world in the Hellenistic and Imperial periods
Titus Flavius Barcaeus	ca. 160-180 AD	IRCyr C.267	
"The City"	ca. 160-180 AD	IRCyr C.267	
Tiberius Flavius Anchistratus	ca. 160-180 AD	IRCyr C.267	
Marcus Ulpius Aris-	ca. 160-180 AD	IRCyr C.267	
Decimus Cascellius Aristoteles	ca. 160-180 AD	IRCyr C.267	
Tiberius Claudius Battus son of Philippus	ca. 161-180 AD	IRCyr C.267, C.299, C.221,	Repaired the Temple of Isis and the Temple of Apollo Nymphagetes. A less likely dating places him in 211-217 AD.
Decimus Cascellius Aristoteles	180-192 AD	IRCyr C.250	Rededicated the reconstructed Temple of Apollo

== Bibliography ==
- Laronde, A. (1987). "Prêtres d'Apollon à Cyrène au Ier siècle ap. J.C.". L'Africa Romana IV. pp. 469–484.
- Marengo, S. M. (1996). "Per un'interpretazione delle liste sacerdotali di Cirene". In Bacchielli, Lidiano; Aravantinos, M. B. (eds.). Studi Miscellanei: Scritti di antichità in memoria di Sandro Stucchi. Roma. pp. 219–226.
- Rosamilia, Emilio (2023). La città del silfio. Istituzioni, culti ed economia di Cirene classica ed ellenistica attraverso le fonti epigrafiche (in Italian). Pisa: Scuola Normale Superiore. ISBN 9788876427367.
