= Greek Theatre of Cyrene =

Roman amphitheatre in Cyrene, Libya

Coordinates: 32.824591°N 21.85083°E

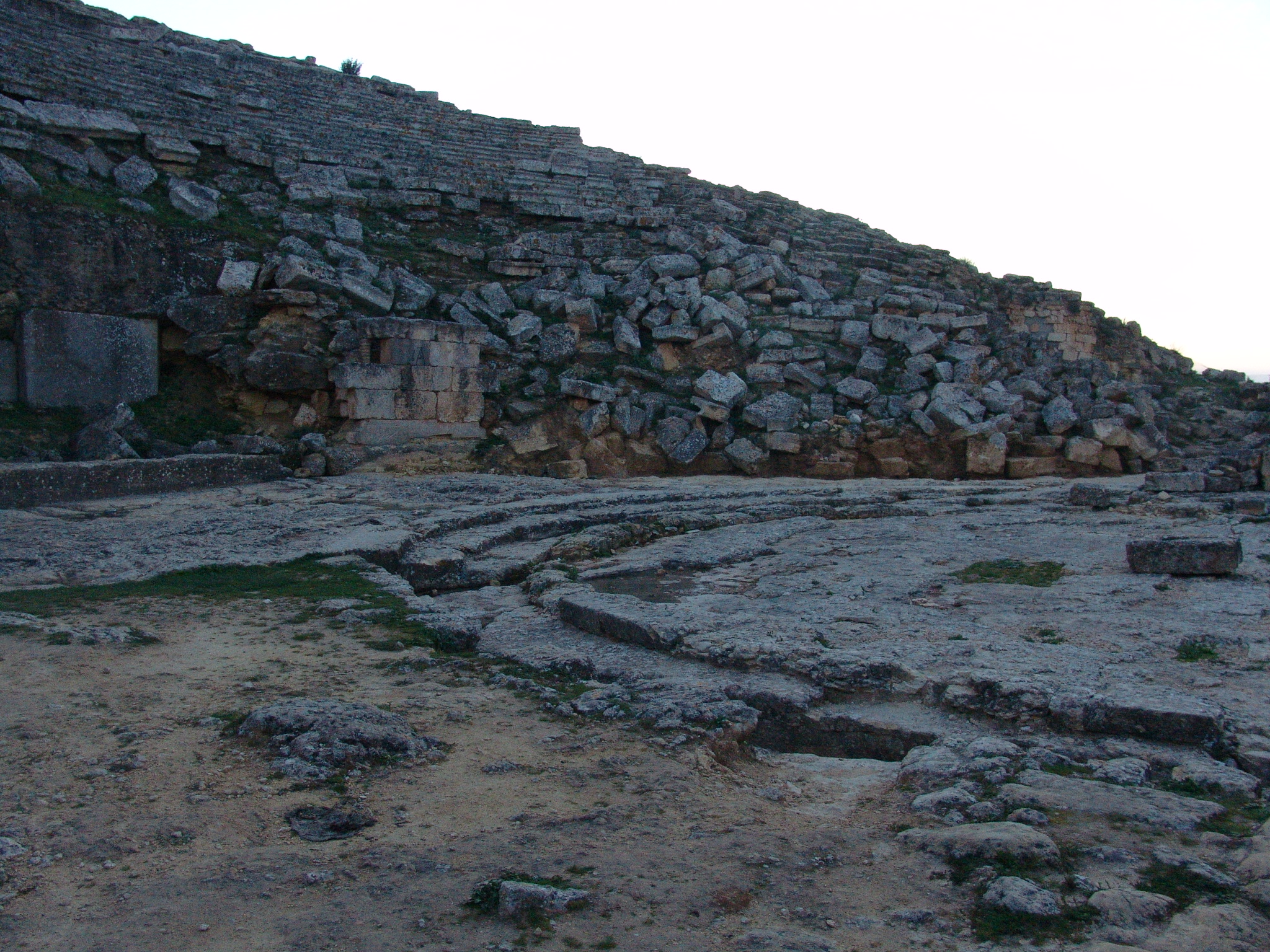
View of the arena of the theatre. The curved masonry in the centre of the arena is the remains of the front row of seating from phase 4 of the theatre. Part of the wall of the arena from phase 7 is visible left of centre.

The Greek Theatre of Cyrene was the largest and oldest of the five known theatres in Cyrene, Libya. It was built on the north slope of the Acropolis, west of the Sanctuary of Apollo and was originally built as a standard Greek theatre, probably in the late sixth century BC. The structure underwent several phases of renovation and was eventually converted into a Roman amphitheatre in the second century AD.

== Description ==
The theatre is located on the west end of the narrow plateau below the Acropolis, which looks north towards the sea. The sanctuary of Apollo is located on the same plateau, to the east and the theatre was originally part of the sanctuary complex. It has a complicated construction history, comprising seven phases, which are not easily distinguished or dated. In most phases, the basic structure consisted of a semicircular orchestra (performance area) with a scenae (stage building) behind it, and a koilon or cavea (seating area) which took advantage of the natural slope of the hill.

The earliest phase is now indicated only by three rows of postholes in the middle of the orchestra, which were probably intended for a small wooden scenae, roughly 15 metres long and 5 metres deep. Parallels from the rest of the Greek world suggest this structure dates to the late sixth century BC. In phase 2, perhaps in the fifth century BC, the scenae was replaced by a slightly larger building, still made of wood and again attested only by a set of postholes in the bedrock. This was roughly 15 metres wide, like its predecessor, but extended back a bit further, and had a wooden stage along the front.

In phase 3, the wooden stage building was demolished in favour of a stone structure, about 25 metres long, located a little further to the north. The first signs of stone seating also derive from this period and suggest a cavea with a diameter of 65 metres. Fragments of earlier structures reused in the building (particularly columns from the archaic temple of Apollo suggest that this construction took place in the second half of the fourth century BC.

Phase 4 dates to the period of Ptolemaic rule at Cyrene (ca. 320-96 BC).The stage building was demolished and replaced with a larger structure, with short wings at each end. This structure had three doors in the front from which actors could make entrances and exits. The stonework is of a poorer quality than in phase 3. At this time, the cavea was expanded and the brought forward; a large retaining wall was built to support the earth fill under the seating at the eastern edge of the theatre. Above this retaining wall, on the east side of the cavea, a very steep stepped pyramidal monument was built, surmounted by a base which supported a set of four statues (now lost). The inscription on the base (IGCyr 97900) dates to the late fourth or early third century BC and names the honorands as Cleuthemis son of Stasis (who erected the monument while serving as a priest), Cleuthemis son of Philengyus, Damon son of Chartadas, and Stasis son of Cleuthemis.

Phase 5 belongs in the early Roman period (i.e. the 1st century BC or AD). In this phase, the stage building was monumentalised, by adding engaged columns to the façade. The lower portion of the surviving seating probably belongs to this phase, as do straight retaining walls on the edges of the cavea. Phase 6 may have followed the sack of the city in 115 AD during the Kitos War; unlike many other structures in Cyrene, there is no evidence that the theatre was damaged during the sack. In this phase, the wings of the scenae were extended forwards, apparently blocking entry to the theatre through the orchestra.

=== Amphitheatre ===
In phase 7, in the late second century AD, the theatre was converted into an amphitheatre, to be used for gladiators instead of drama. The semi-circular orchestra was converted into an oval shaped arena, measuring 32.67 metres from east to west and 28.21 from north to south. To accomplish this, the scenae was demolished, the lower seating was removed, a wall was built around the arena, and the plateau was extended northwards by means of a huge retaining wall. A peripheral corridor surrounded the arena, under the front rows of seating, which led to entrances for combatants at the eastern and western ends of the arena. On the south side of the arena, new seating was built over the top of the cavea of phase 5. The cliff-side location meant that it was impossible to build seating on the north side of the arena, which was thus left open.

The new amphitheatre was separated from the sanctuary of Apollo to the west by the construction of the Wall of Nicodamus, which crosses the plateau from north to south to the east of the theatre. A verse inscription (GVCyr 31) names priest Nicodamus as the builder and specifies that it was built to "for the purity of Phoebus and his sister" (Apollo and Artemis) by "shutting off their sacred bushes from the sight of the gladiators." This was necessary because gladiatorial combat was considered ritually impure. Since there was no gate in this wall, access to the amphitheatre was henceforth by only from above, using a road which ran along the hillside above the sanctuary of Apollo. Theatre 2, east of the Agora, behind the Stoa of Hermes and Heracles and the Caesareum, may have been built as a replacement for the Greek Theatre.

It is unclear when the amphitheatre went out of use. Cyrene was heavily damaged by earthquakes in 262 and 365, either of which may have damaged the structure. Since antiquity much of the north side of the arena has slipped down the hillside. From 2006, the Global Heritage Fund, in partnership with the Second University of Naples (SUN, Italy), the Libyan Department of Antiquities, and the Libyan Ministry of Culture conducted emergency conservation on the theatre to halt the subsidence.

== Bibliography ==
- Ensoli, S. (2010). "Il teatro-anfiteatro del Santuario di Apollo a Cirene". In Luni, M. (ed.). Cirene e la Cirenaica nell'Antichità. Roma. pp. 117–145.
- Kenrick, Philip (2013). Cyrenaica. Libya Archaeological Guides. Vol. 2. Silphium Press. ISBN 978-1-900971-14-0.
- Stucchi, Sandro (1976). Architettura cirenaica. Rome: Bretschneider. pp. 286–289. ISBN 887062448X.
- Thiessen, Oliver J. (2012). "Die Entwicklung des Apollon-Heiligtums von Kyrene vom 4. Jh. v. Chr. bis zum Ende des Hellenismus". KuBA. 2: 69–89. ISBN 978-3-643-99857-6.
