= Aretaphila of Cyrene =

Cyrenean noblewoman

Aretaphila of Cyrene (Ancient Greek: Ἀρεταφίλα; fl. c. 50 BC) was a noblewoman from Cyrene, an ancient Greek colony in North Africa. According to Plutarch in his work De mulierum virtutes (On the Virtues of Women), she deposed the tyrant Nicocrates.

Nicocrates forced Aretaphila to marry him after murdering her husband, Phaedimus. Under his rule, the citizens of Cyrene were brutalized, their property was seized, and their homes were destroyed. Aretaphila was determined to free her people from the violent ruler and conspired to poison him. Nicocrates mother, Calbia, suspected her plans and convinced him to have Aretaphila tortured.

Aretaphila's forced second marriage produced one daughter, whom she encouraged to seduce her father's brother, Leander, in an effort to depose of her tyrannical father. Aretaphila was able to convince Leander to murder Nicocrates. Unfortunately, Leander proved to be as much of a tyrant as his brother, prompting Aretaphila to craft a new plan to free her people of oppressive foreign rulers. She bribed the Libyan Prince Anabus to capture Leander and arrest him. Aretaphila was praised by the Cyrenean public and offered a role in the new government, but declined. She is written to have spent the rest of her life in the women's quarters of her home, at her loom. Historians have debated Aretaphila's role as a cult figure for women in her time.
