= Necropolis of Cyrene =

Ancient necropolis in Libya

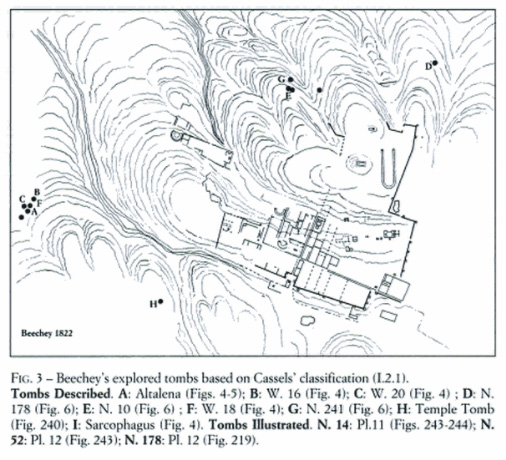
- Location ancient port of Apollonia

- Location within Libya
- 32.9°N 21.966667°E
- Location: Libya
- Region: Jabal al Akhdar

The Necropolis of Cyrene is a necropolis located between Cyrene, Libya and the ancient port of Apollonia, at the western slope of the Wadi Haleg Shaloof hill. It is around 10 square kilometres in size. With terraced archaic tombs, the cemetery is near the ancient road to Apollonia. The necropolis is today partially lost, as parts were bulldozed in 2013 by local residents to make way for development. The UNESCO classified the site in 1982 as a World Heritage Site, and added Cyrene in 2017 to its List of World Heritage in Danger.

== General ==
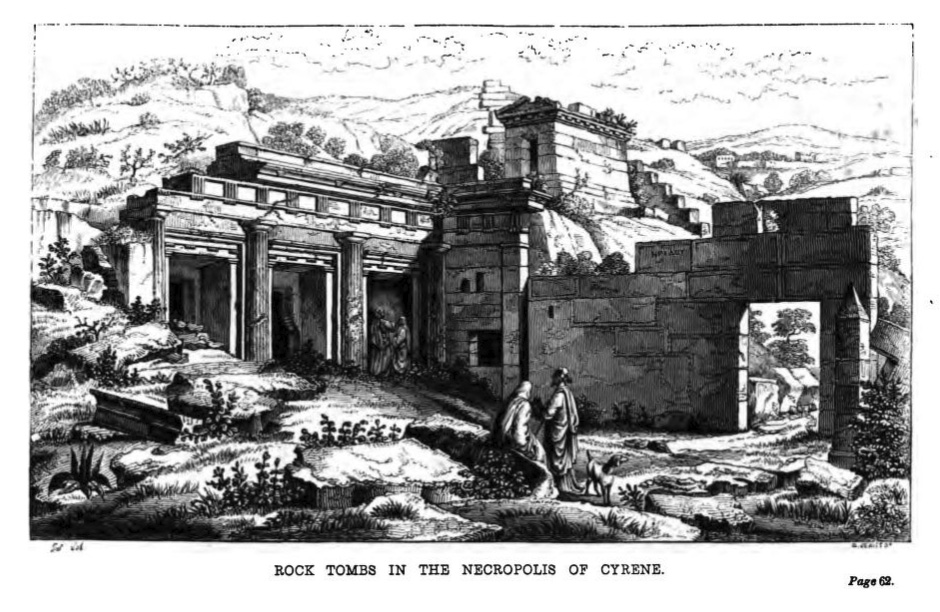
Wanderings in North Africa by James Hamilton 1856

Earliest traces of Cyrene date back to about 700 BC, it is considered to be the oldest and largest Greek colony in eastern Libya. It is believed that the ancient, now extinct plant Silphium only grew in the Cyrene region.

In 2013 the local archaeology professor Ahmed Hussein from Bayda University noted:

"This ancient necropolis is one of the most important in the world. Its burial vaults and sarcophagi were built in about 600 B.C. These tombs are spread out on each side of a road that leads to the centre of the ancient city of Cyrene. The site was damaged along about two kilometres. About 200 vaults and tombs were destroyed, as well as a section of a viaduct that dates back to approximately 200 A.D. Ancient artefacts were thrown into a nearby river as if they were mere rubbish."

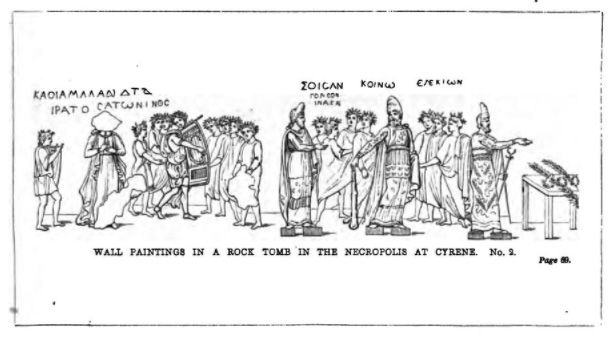
Tomb wall painting Necropolis of Cyrene 1856

James Hamilton described the Necropolis of Cyrene in his visit 1856:

"Some feelings of melancholy must be awakened in every visitor, as he follows those long lines of violated sepulchres, ranged along the sides of the hills, obtruding far into the plain below, and stretching in every direction across the table-land to the south. The simple sarcophagus and proud mausoleum now alike gape tenantless; perpetuating neither the affection of the survivors nor the merits of the dead, they are mute as to their history, their fate, and almost their names. Barbarian hands have disturbed the relics, and rifled the treasures which they once contained; the existence of such treasures must have been the incentive to, and can alone account for the universal violation of the tombs — hatred, if profitless as well as toilsome, is seldom thus unrelenting."

"The northern face of the eastern hill seems to have been the first place used for sepulture; and, judging from the style, I should think that some monuments, about half a mile from the fountain, on the road to Apollonia, are among the earliest. They are large sepulchres, with fades cut in the solid rock, with porticoes, in a very early Greek, almost Egyptian, style. I am inclined to think that the sepulchres, which are entirely excavated, without any adjuncts of masonry, are of two epochs, the earliest and latest, the former, though generally rude, impressive in their monolithic vastness; the latter, in their meretriciously minute though graceful decorations, reminding me forcibly of Pompeii. Some of these one finds, in which the smoothed rock is scored with lines, to imitate masonry, like the stuccoed houses of Belgravia."

"The inscriptions, scarcely legible, seem to consist of the names of visitors, to the unlearned offer no interest. The whole series evidently refer to the games of the ancients; chariot-races, gladiators, wrestlers, and pugilists, occupying the two sides which are damaged. There are two wrestlers, with a third figure, who seems to be taking a flying leap over their heads, but who may be intended to be lying on the ground overcome, while the judge, with the prize-cup, or, perhaps, the oil for anointing, looks on in the comer. To the right are two figures, one of whom seems to be inviting the first, a youth, to enter a doorway to which he points; which I conjecture to be the introduction of a youth to the study of rhetoric or poetry. It is here the inscriptions begin. The action of the next two figures is indistinguishable. We next see a figure in long drapery, crowned with ivy or vine-leaves, his right hand extended, in his left a lyre. An orator, or poet, with a roll in his hand, follows next; and, after him, the same draped figure, now playing on the lyre."

"The next group is, unfortunately, much damaged, as its composition is remarkable. It contains eight figures, all crowned with ivy; the fourth blowing the double horn; before them goes a nude figure, bearing a square chest. Here there is a figure now headless, and again the musician playing on the lyre, surrounded by seven persons. A male figure, in a tragic masque, appears to be declaiming to a female also masqued, who is surrounded by seven other females, crowned with garlands. [..] in style they much resemble many of the Pompeian frescoes, to which time, or rather later, they may be assigned. On either side of the door, are an animal-fight and a hunt. On one, a bull attacked by a lion, while a tiger is preparing to spring upon his neck; above are stags, a gazelle, dogs, and a chacal. Spears are flying all about the picture."

== Excavations ==
Excavations began in the 19th century, or earlier. Richard Norton excavated the site in 1911. Rowe, found fragments of a Ptolemaic cinerary urn, a Theia figure, and surveyed, excavated tombs there between 1952 and 1957. Rowe was the first to make an extensive archaeological study of the Necropolis of Cyrene, however, many artifacts from his excavations, and from Oliverio in 1925, are today considered to be lost. Burton Brown excavated two sarcophagi and a Roman burial in 1947. Beschi excavated two tombs in 1963.

== Gallery ==
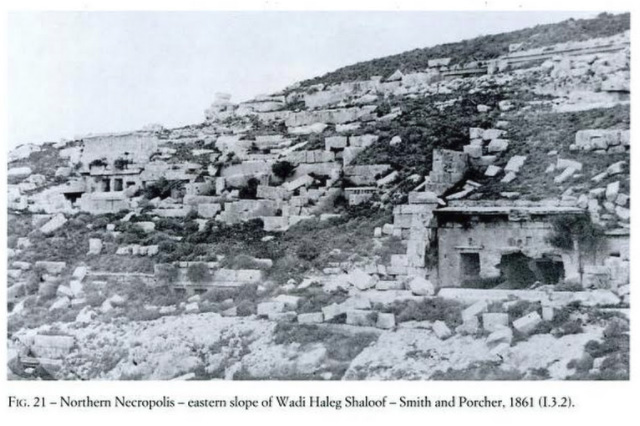
Smith and Porcher 1861

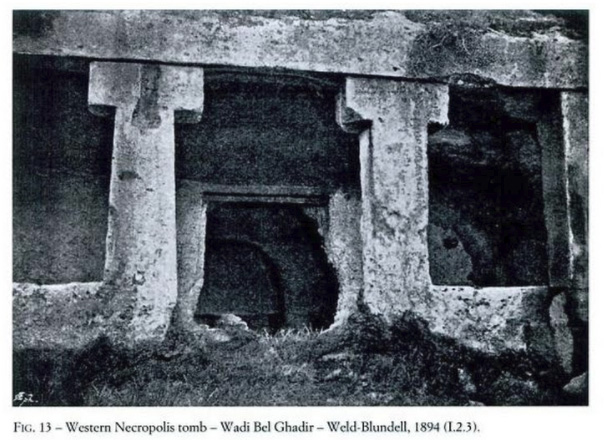
Weld-Blundell 1894

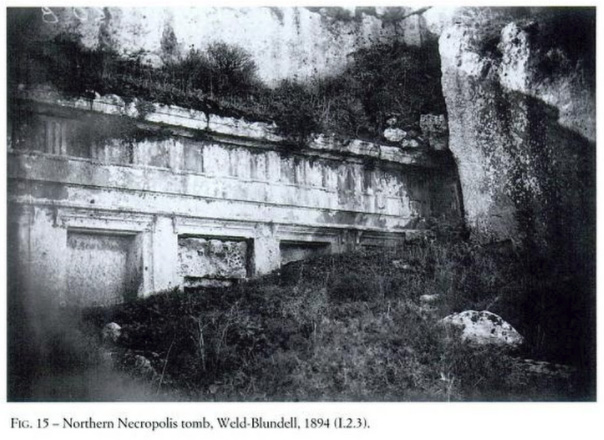
Weld-Blundell 1894

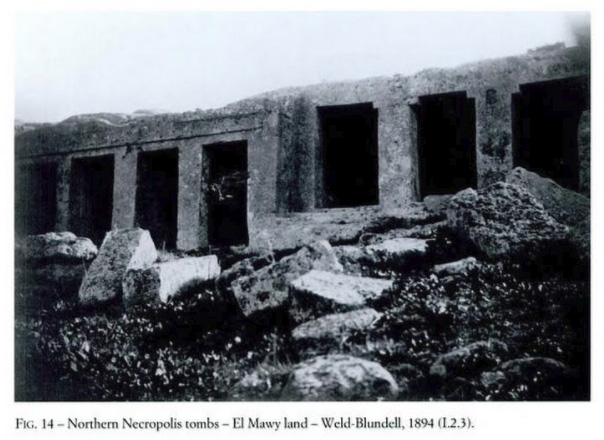
Weld-Blundell 1894

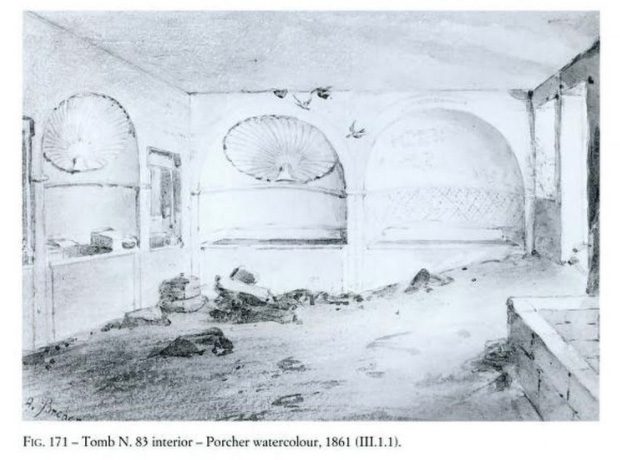
Porcher 1861

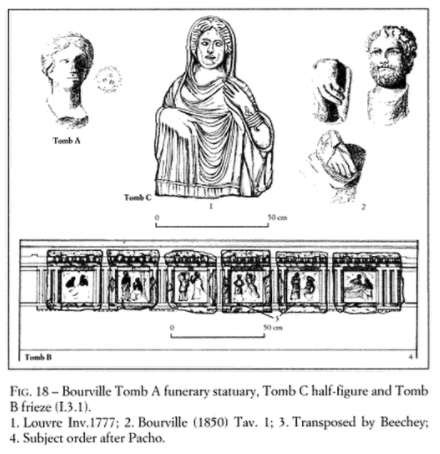
Beechey 1850, funerary statues

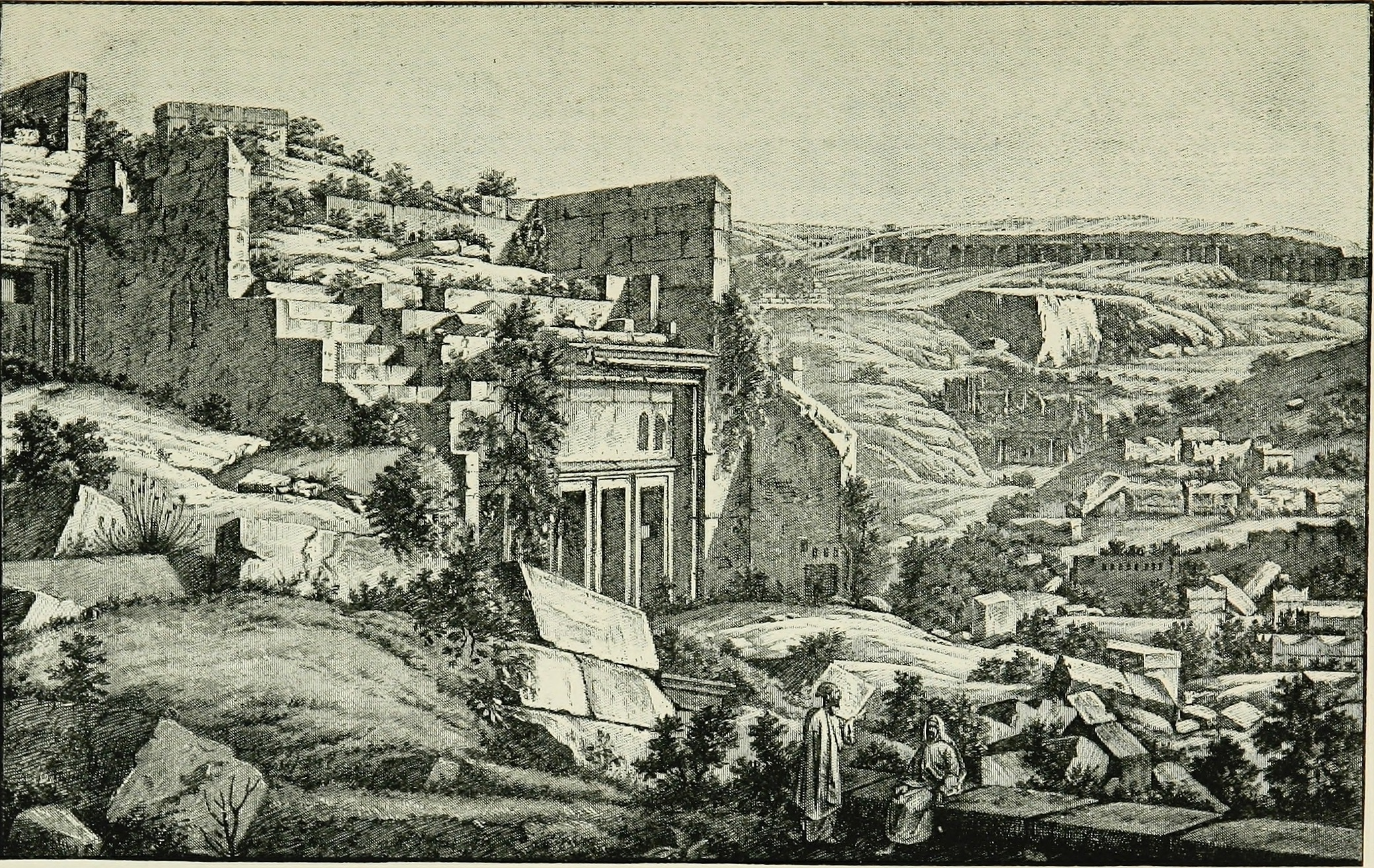
Illustrated in the book "History of Egypt, Chaldea, Syria, Babylonia and Assyria (1903)"

== See also ==
- Ancient Libya
