= Cyrene, Libya =

Ancient Greek and Roman city near present-day Shahhat, Libya

Cyrene
- Κυρήνη (Ancient Greek)
- Kyrene
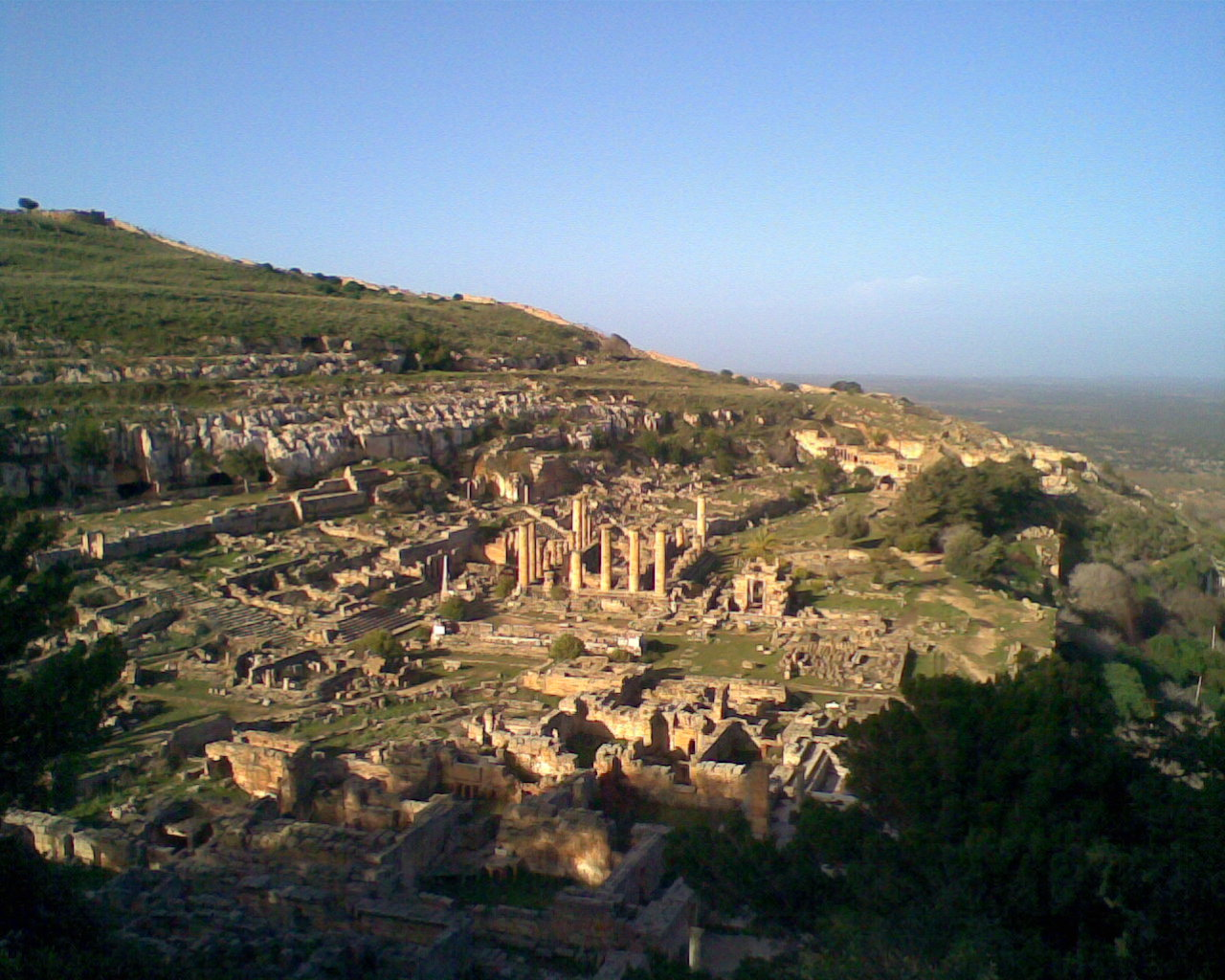
- Sanctuary of Apollo at Cyrene

- Location within Libya
- 32°49′21″N 21°51′45″E
- Type: Settlement
- Periods: Archaic Greece to Umayyad Caliphate
- Location: Shahhat, Jabal al Akhdar, Cyrenaica, Libya
- Region: Jebel Akhdar

History
- Built: 631 BC
- Built by: Colonists from Thera led by Battus I
- Abandoned: 7th century AD

UNESCO World Heritage Site
- Official name: Archaeological Site of Cyrene
- Type: Cultural
- Criteria: ii, iii, vi
- Designated: 1982 (6th session)
- Reference no.: 190
- Region: Arab States

Cyrene, also sometimes anglicized as Kyrene, was an ancient Greek colony and Roman city near present-day Shahhat in northeastern Libya in North Africa. It was part of the Pentapolis, an important group of five cities in the region, and gave the area its classical and early modern name Cyrenaica.

Cyrene lies on a ridge of the Jebel Akhdar uplands. The archaeological remains cover several hectares and include several monumental temples, stoas, theatres, bathhouses, churches, and palatial residences. The city is surrounded by the Necropolis of Cyrene. Since 1982, it has been a UNESCO World Heritage Site. The city's port was Apollonia (Marsa Sousa), located about 16 kilometres (10 mi) to the north.

The city was attributed to Apollo and the legendary etymon Cyrene by the Greeks themselves but it was probably actually colonized by settlers from Thera (modern Santorini) in the late seventh century BC. It was initially ruled by a dynasty of monarchs called the Battiads, who grew rich and powerful as a result of successive waves of immigration and the export of horses and silphium, a medicinal plant. By the fifth century BC, they had expanded their control over the other cities of Cyrenaica. It became the seat of the Cyrenaics, a school of philosophy in the fourth century BC, founded by Aristippus, a disciple of Socrates. In the Hellenistic Age, the city alternated between being part of Ptolemaic Egypt and the capital of an independent kingdom. It was also an important Jewish hub. In 96 BC, it passed to the Roman Republic and became part of the province of Crete and Cyrenaica. The city was destroyed by Jewish fighters in AD 115 during the Diaspora Revolt, and slowly rebuilt over the following century. Earthquakes in 262 and 365 devastated the city, but some habitation continued through the early Byzantine period and the Muslim conquest of the Maghreb in 642, after which the site was abandoned until the establishment of an Italian military base on the site in 1913. Excavations have been ongoing since that time.

== Name ==
Cyrene is the latinized form of the Greek name Kȳrḗnē (Κυρήνη) of uncertain origin. The Greeks themselves attributed the name to the legendary Thessalian princess Cyrene who supposedly founded the city with help from the sun god Apollo. Some modern scholars sometimes attribute the name to its spring Cyra (Κύρα, Kýra), which was considered sacred to Apollo by the city's Greco-Roman inhabitants. The legend of Thessalian Cyrene seems to long predate attestation of the spring, however, and Janko instead suggests that the existing legend and name were adopted by the early Theran settlers for this specific location after some unattested but similar local name in the Libu or Garamantian language. Another theory draws a connection between the city's name and the Libyan word for the asphodil plant which grew abundantly in the area. Although both the Greek and Latin forms of the name were pronounced something like /kuˈreɪneɪ/ koo-RAY-nay, they are more often read in English as /kaɪˈriːni/ ky-REE-nee or, in its Latin form, /saɪˈriːni/ sy-REE-nee.

== History ==
People have lived in Cyrenaica since the Palaeolithic. There is some evidence for settlement in the caves below the Acropolis which may pre-date Greek settlement. It is possible that Minoans and Mycenaeans visited Cyrene in the Bronze Age, since it is on the easiest sea route from the Aegean to Egypt, but the only archaeological evidence for this are separate finds of a small Minoan altar and a Minoan seal, which might have been brought over at a later date.

=== Foundation ===
A Greek myth first recorded by Pindar in the early fifth century BC reports that the god Apollo fell in love with the huntress Cyrene and brought her to Libya, where she gave birth to a son Aristaeus. Greek historical traditions, reported in Herodotus' Histories and in a fourth-century BC inscription found at Cyrene, say that a group of Cretan Greeks, who had been expelled from Sparta and settled on the island of Thera, founded Cyrene in 631 BC, under the leadership of Battus I, at the prompting of the Oracle of Delphi. Some traditions say that the settlers left Thera because of a famine, others because of a civil war. Most say that the colonists first settled on an island at Aziris (east of Derna) before relocating to Cyrene. The historicity of these narratives is uncertain, particularly the idea that Thera was Cyrene's sole "mother city". Relationships with other cities, such as Sparta and Samos, mentioned in the foundation narratives, are uncertain.

Archaeological evidence from the site, especially ceramic finds, confirm that Greek settlement began in the mid-seventh century BC. This early pottery derives from Thera, Sparta, and Samos, but also Rhodes. The initial area of habitation was a ridge stretching eastwards from the Acropolis to the Agora, but the city rapidly expanded eastwards. The sanctuary of Apollo to the north of the Acropolis, of Demeter to the south, and of Zeus to the east all go back to the seventh or sixth centuries BC. Archaeological evidence shows that several other sites in Cyrenaica, such as Apollonia, Euesperides, and Taucheira (modern Benghazi and Tocra) were settled at the same time as Cyrene.

=== Archaic period ===
After its foundation, the city was ruled by a series of monarchs descended from Battus I. Over the course of the sixth century BC, Cyrene grew to become the most powerful city in the region. In the first half of the sixth century BC, Battus II encouraged further Greek settlement in the city, especially from the Peloponnese and Crete. This sparked conflict with the indigenous Libyans, whose king Adicran appealed to Egypt for help around 570 BC. The pharaoh Apries launched a military expedition against Cyrene, but was decisively defeated at the Battle of Irasa.

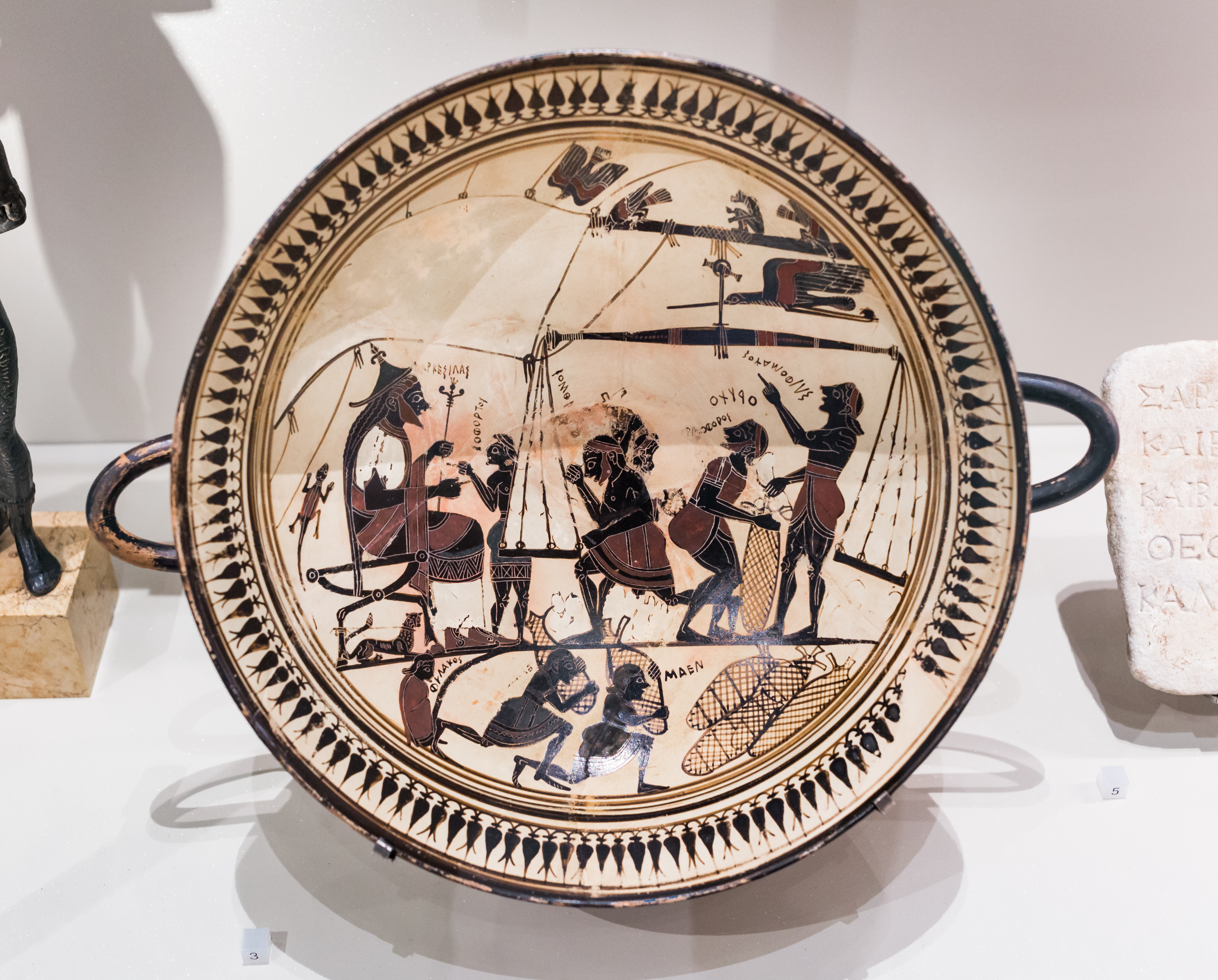
Arcesilaus II oversees the weighing of silphium for export, on a Laconian kylix, c. 565–560 BC.

According to Herodotus, conflict with king Arcesilaus II "the Cruel" (c. 560–550 BC) led his brothers to leave the city and found the city of Barca to the west. Archaeological evidence shows that Greek presence at Barca predates this foundation, going back to the seventh century. Arcesilaus was defeated by the Barcans and Libyans at the Battle of Leuco, killed by his brother and succeeded by his infant son Battus III (c. 550–530 BC), under whom Cyrene continued to suffer from continued internal conflict. This was resolved through a reform of the city's laws by Demonax of Mantinea. These reforms appear to have limited the authority of the king to religious matters, vested political power in the Cyrenaean people, and divided the Cyreneans into three tribes. He may also have mediated a peace with Barca and introduced trial by combat.

Battus III's son Arcesilaus III (c. 530–515 BC) attempted to revoke Demonax's constitution and was driven into exile. He returned with an army from Samos and regained control but forced out once more and was assassinated at Barca. His mother Pheretime appealed to the Achaemenid governor of Egypt, Aryandes, who besieged and sacked Barca in 515 BC. According to Herodotus, Aryandes marched his troops through Cyrene and then, regretting that he had not taken the opportunity to conquer Cyrene, attempted to get back in, but was prevented. The story is strange; it may be that the city was actually conquered by the Persians. Remains of an extramural temple destroyed by the Persians at this time have been found.

=== Classical period ===
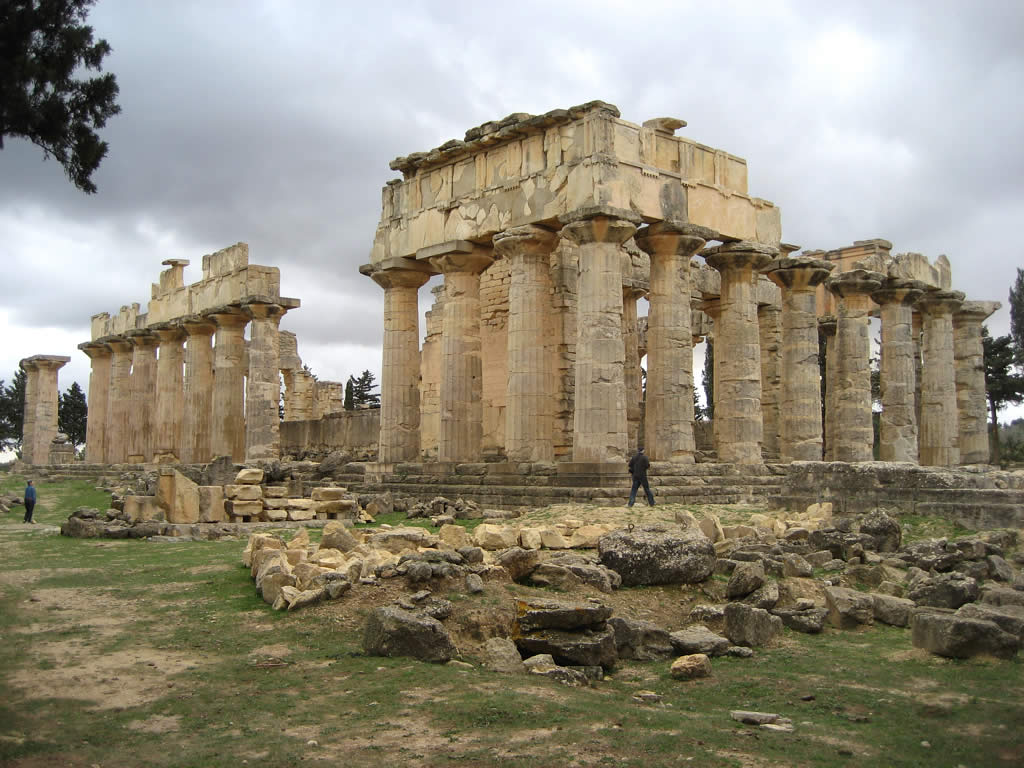
The Temple of Zeus, Cyrene

In the fifth century BC, perhaps as a consequence of the Persian intervention, Cyrene's influence over the other Greek cities in Cyrenaica seems to have solidified into institutionalised political control. The city was prosperous and construction of the Temple of Apollo, Temple of Zeus, Temple of Demeter, and structures in the Agora date to this time. Cyrene's chief local export through much of its early history was the medicinal herb silphium, which may have been used as an abortifacient; the herb was pictured on most Cyrenian coins. Silphium was in such demand that it was harvested to extinction by the end of the first century AD. Cyrene also made money from raising of horses and the transhipment trade between Egypt, the Aegean, and Carthage. It was a landing point for Greeks seeking to visit the oracle of Ammon at Siwah.

Arcesilaus IV won the chariot race at the Pythian Games in 462 BC and at the Olympic Games in 460 BC, in celebration of which Pindar wrote the Fourth and Fifth Pythian Odes. Following this victory, he organised a new wave of Greek settlement at Euesperides. Some time after this however, the Cyrenean's monarchy was abolished in obscure circumstances and the tomb of his ancestor Battus I was destroyed. In 454 BC, Cyrene gave refuge to the remnants of an Athenian army that had been defeated by the Persians in Egypt. In the following years, Barca seems to have become the dominant city in the region and Cyrene was regularly in conflict with the other Greek cities of Cyrenaica and with the Libyans. In 414 BC, during the Peloponnesian War, Spartan forces travelling to Sicily were driven to Cyrenaica by adverse winds and Cyrene provided them with two triremes and pilots to lead them to Sicily.

Towards the end of the fifth century BC, one Ariston took control of the city, put five hundred leading Cyreneans to death and exiled others. It is possible that he attempted to establish a radical democracy on the Athenian model. A group of 3,000 Messenians who had been expelled from Naupactus by the Spartans arrived in Cyrene in 404 BC and joined forces with the exiles, but were almost all killed in a battle, after which the Cyrenean exiles and the followers of Ariston reconciled. The surviving Messenians settled at Euhesperides. There are some signs that civic conflict continued over the following century.

During the fourth century BC, Cyrene clashed with Carthage over the Syrtis and the trans-Saharan trade routes that ended there. The border was established at the Altars of the Phileni. Cyrene may also have extended its control eastwards to Catabathmus Magnus. Cyrene constructed a treasury at Delphi between 350 and 325 BC. When Alexander the Great conquered Egypt in 331 BC and marched west to visit the oracle at Siwah, the Cyreneans sent an embassy to declare their friendship; they did not come under Macedonian control. An inscription records that during a famine in the late 320s, Cyrene sent over 800,000 medimni of grain (c. 40,000,000 litres) to the cities of Greece and the Macedonian royal family.

=== Hellenistic period ===
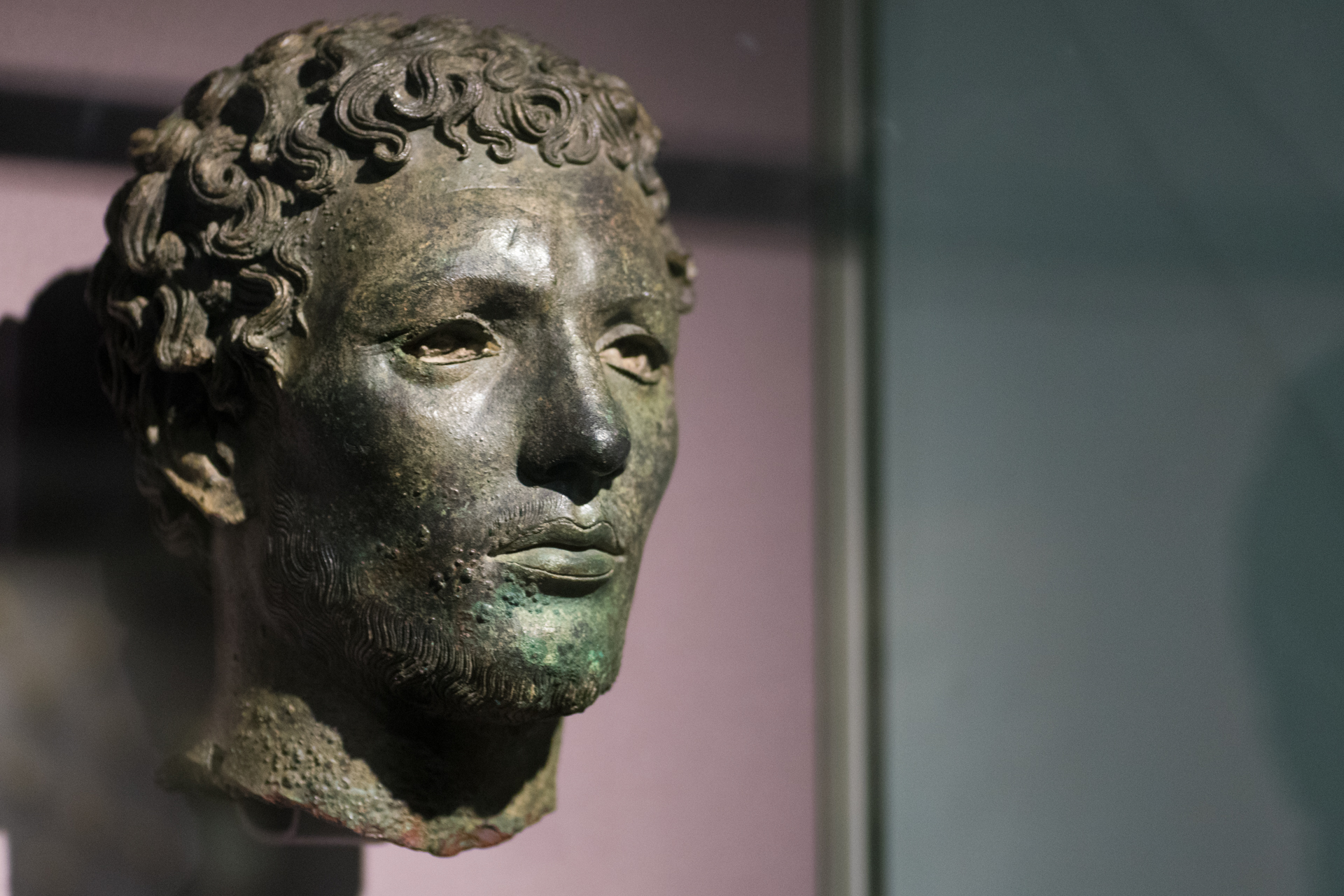
The Cyrene bronze head in the British Museum (300 BC)

In 324 BC, a Spartan mercenary leader, Thibron, joined forces with Cyrenean and Barcan exiles on Crete and invaded Cyrenaica, capturing Cyrene's port and forcing Cyrene to accept his rule. However, one of his officers, Mnasicles, defected to the Cyreneans and helped them to expel Thibron's troops and recapture the port. Cyrene allied with the Libyans and Carthaginians, but Thibron returned in 322 BC and defeated them. A democratic revolution took place in Cyrene and the exiled aristocrats appealed to Ptolemy I Soter for help. Ptolemy sent his general Ophellas to occupy the city and established a new constitution for the city, which is recorded on a large inscription, which was heavily oligarchic and reserved a permanent role for himself in the city's administration. The city was accepted by the other Macedonian leaders as part of the Ptolemaic realm in the Treaty of Triparadisus in 321 BC. Cyrenean rebels attempted to expel the Ptolemaic garrison in 313 BC, but Ptolemy sent reinforcements who suppressed the revolt. In 308 BC, Ophellas led Cyrenaean and Athenian troops west to join Agathocles of Syracuse's attack on Carthage and was immediately murdered.

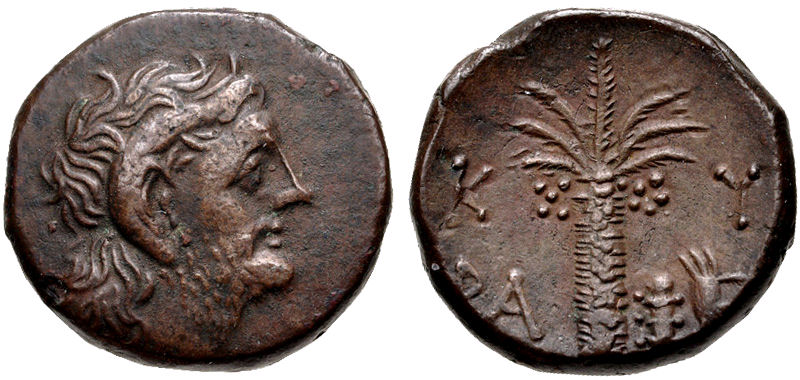
Coin of Magas as king of Cyrene, circa 282/75 to 261 BC

Cyrene rebelled against Ptolemy again around 305 BC. Control was re-established in 300 BC by Ptolemy's step-son Magas. After Ptolemy's death in 282 BC, Magas refused to submit to his half-brother Ptolemy II and had crowned himself king by 276 BC. He married Apama the daughter of the Seleucid king Antiochus I and assisted him in an unsuccessful invasion of Egypt during the First Syrian War. Inscribed accounts indicate severe inflation of food prices and a large fundraising campaign, possibly for repairs to the city walls. After his death, Apama invited a Macedonian prince, Demetrius the Fair, to marry her daughter Berenice and take the throne, but he was murdered after a short conflict with Berenice. She married Ptolemy III in 246 BC, bringing Cyrene back under Ptolemaic control. In the process, the city of Euesperides was destroyed and re-founded as Berenice and the cities of Cyrenaica formed a federation, called the Pentapolis, which minted its own coinage. Constitutional reforms by a pair of Arcadians, Ecdelus and Demophanes, may also belong in this period.

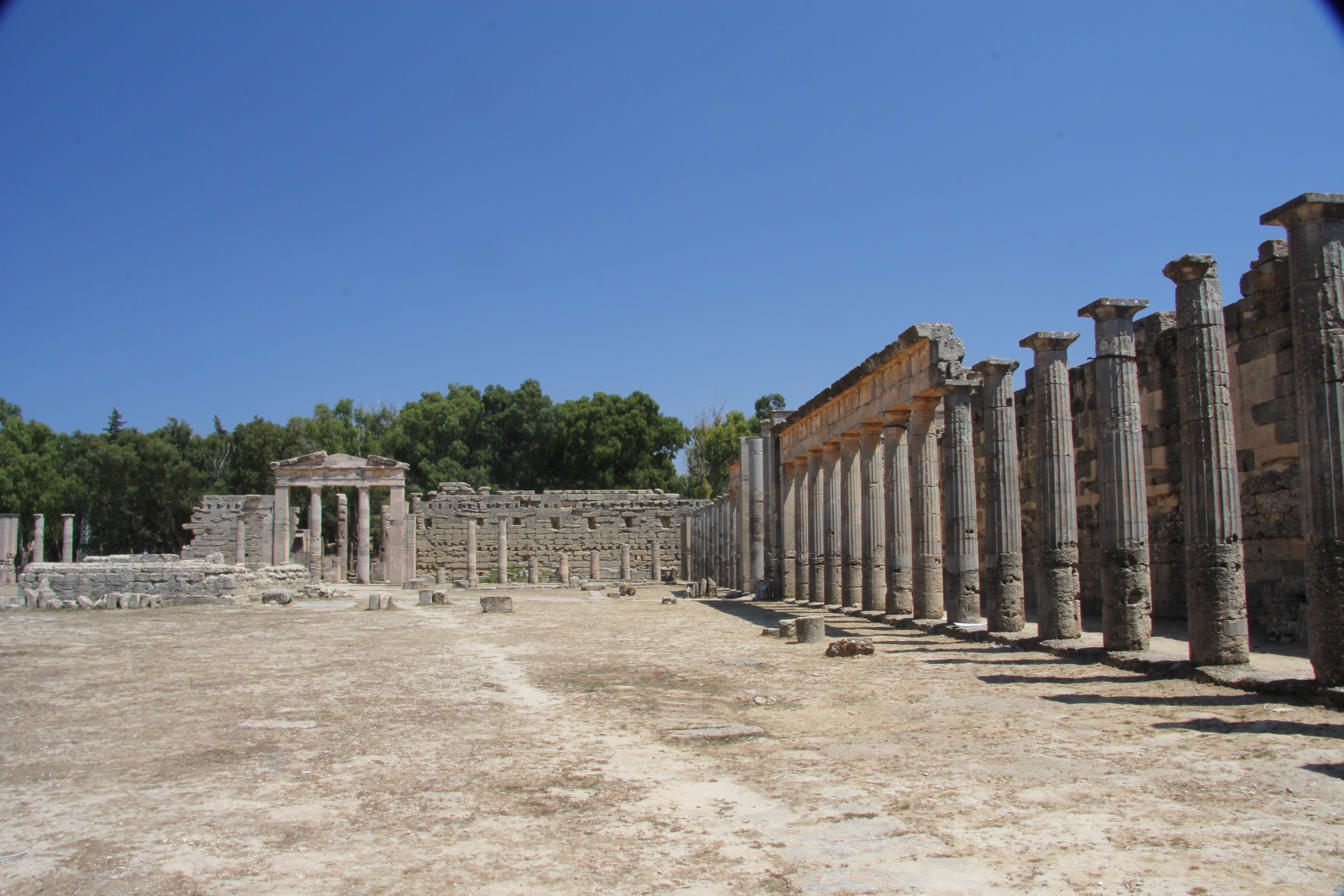
Gymnasium of Cyrene

Cyrene was reduced to subject status, a garrison was installed, and a succession of Ptolemaic courtiers were appointed to the city's priesthood of Apollo. Cyrene was established as a separate kingdom once more for Ptolemy VIII in 163 BC after his siblings expelled him from Egypt. The city rebelled against him but was defeated. It is possible that he granted Cyrene's port, Apollonia, independence from Cyrene at this time, as a reward for remaining loyal. Ptolemy engaged in a wide-ranging construction project in the city, including the construction of a monumental gymnasium. He also had a will inscribed, promising Cyrene to the Roman Republic in the event that he died without heirs. However, he regained control of Egypt in 145 BC. In the dynastic conflicts that followed, Cyrene probably remained under the control of Ptolemy VIII and then of Ptolemy IX. It was apparently given to Ptolemy VIII's illegitimate son Ptolemy Apion as a separate kingdom c. 105–101 BC. Apion made a similar will to that of his father and the territory passed to Rome when he died without heirs in 96 BC.

The city became an important Jewish centre during the Hellenistic period. The deuterocanonical book 2 Maccabees is said by its author to be an abridgment of a five-volume work by a Hellenized Jew by the name of Jason of Cyrene who lived around 100 BC.

=== Roman period ===
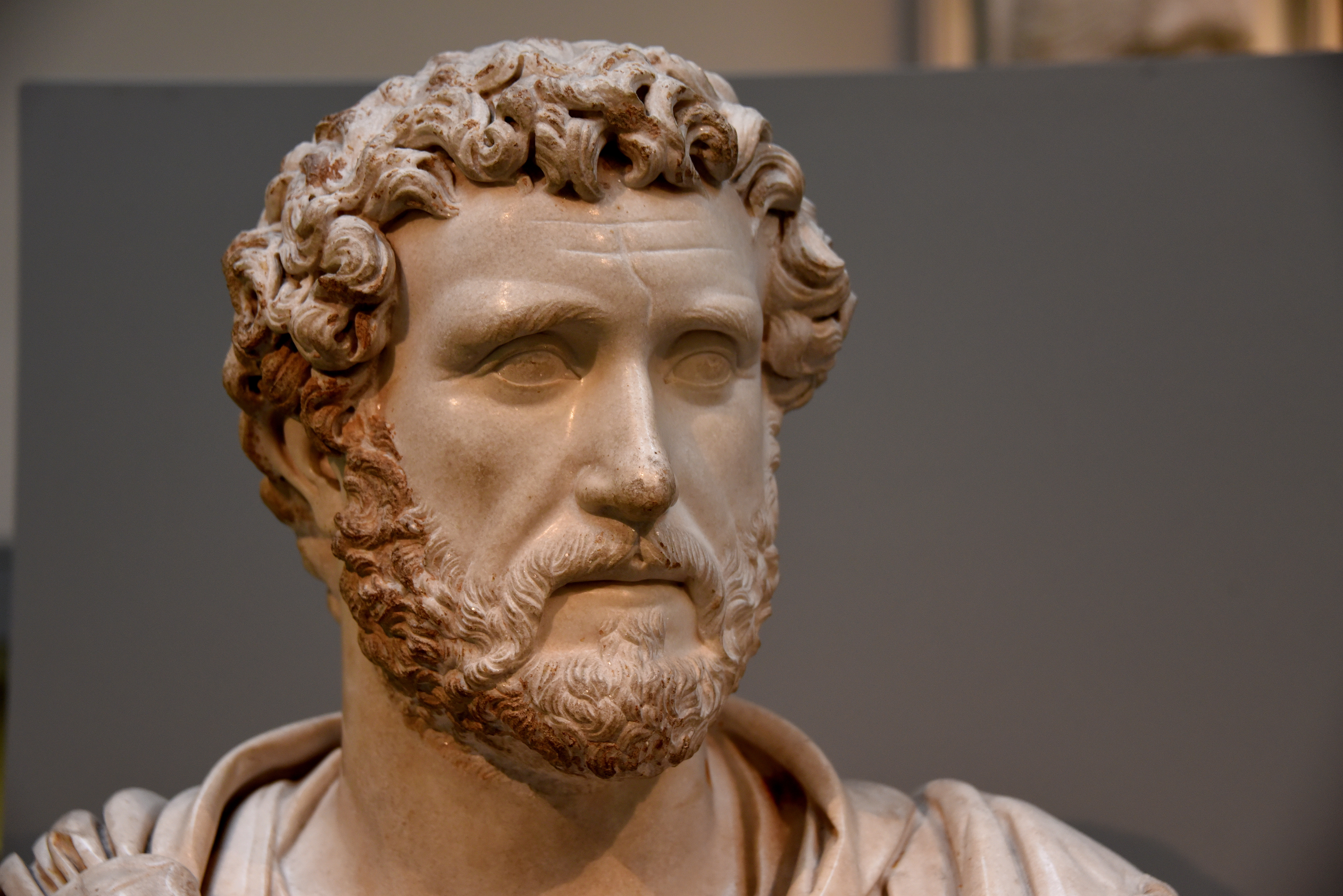
Marble bust of Emperor Antoninus Pius (r. 138–161 AD), from the house of Jason Magnus at Cyrene, now in The British Museum, London

After 96 BC, the Romans initially ignored the new territory. Plutarch mentions a tyrant of Cyrene, Nicocrates, who was deposed by his wife Aretaphila of Cyrene and succeeded by his brother Learchus, who was murdered in turn. Lucullus visited the city in 87 BC, suppressed the tyranny and granted Cyrene a new constitution. But it was only in 74 BC that the Romans first sent a governor, Publius Cornelius Lentulus Marcellinus. At some point between 67 and 30 BC, Cyrenaica became part of the Roman province of Crete and Cyrenaica. The provincial capital was on Crete, but Cyrene remained the chief city in Cyrenaica and enjoyed a highly prosperous period and much construction dates to the first century AD. In the mid-first century AD, the Roman authorities launched an extensive surveying campaign to reclaim the public land around Cyrene that had slipped into private control and stopped paying dividends to the fisc.

Because of its large Jewish population, Cyrene was an early centre of Christianity. A Cyrenian named Simon carried the cross of Jesus. Acts claims that Jews from Cyrene heard the disciples speaking in their own language in Jerusalem on the day of Pentecost and later says that Jewish Christians from Cyrene and Cyprus were among those in Antioch who began spreading the gospel among Gentiles. According to the tradition of the Coptic Orthodox Church, its founder, Saint Mark was a native of Cyrene and ordained the first bishop of Cyrene.

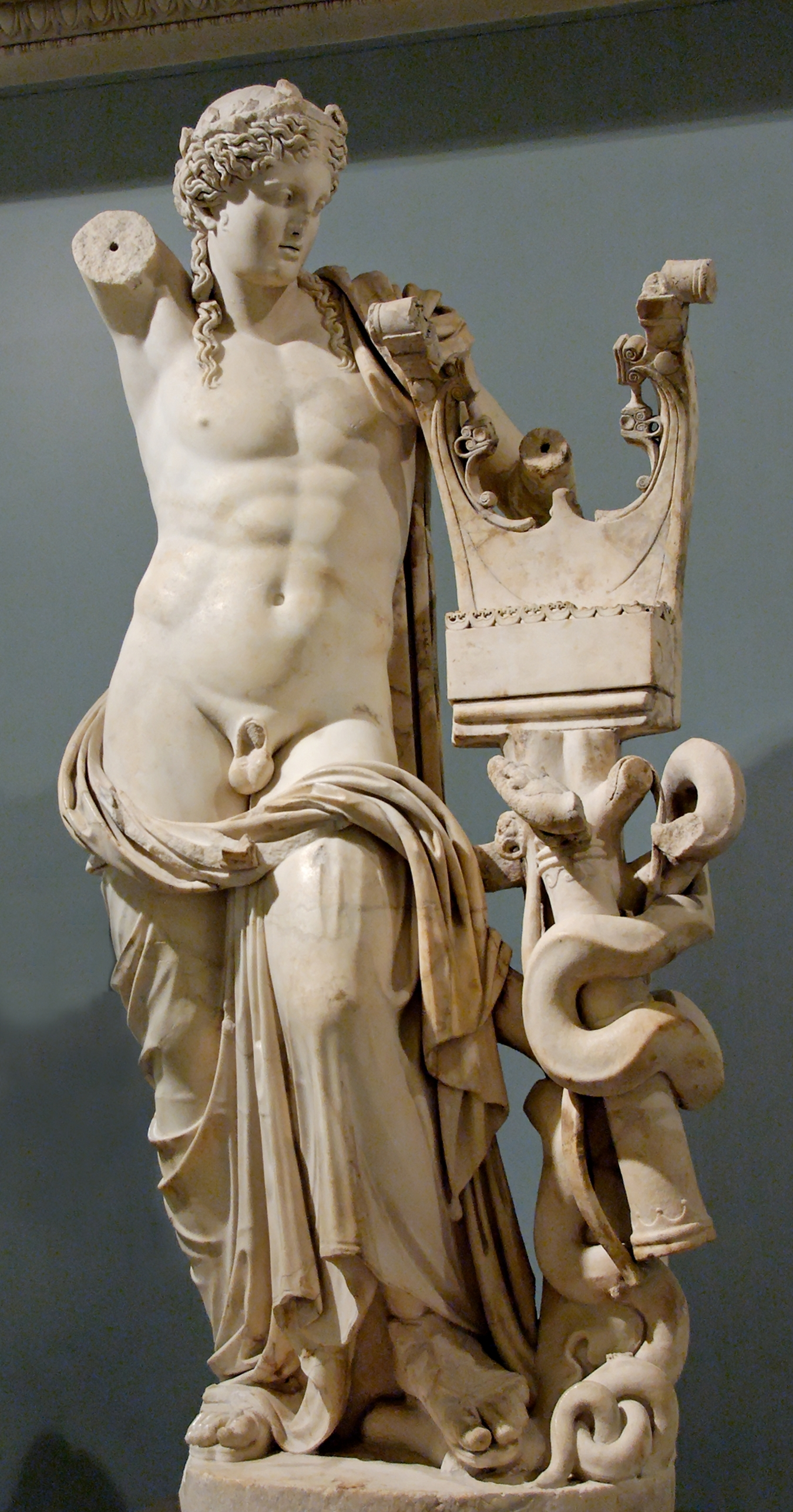
Apollo Kitharoidos from Cyrene. Roman statue from the second century AD now in the British Museum

A massive Jewish revolt, the Diaspora revolt, broke out in Cyrenaica, Egypt, Mesopotamia, Cyprus and Judaea in 115 AD. Cyrene was sacked and almost all of the city's buildings were destroyed. Literary sources claim that 220,000 people were killed before the revolt was quelled by Marcius Turbo. According to Eusebius of Caesarea, the Jewish rebellion left Libya depopulated to such an extent that a few years later new colonies had to be established there by the emperor Hadrian to maintain the viability of continued settlement. Restoration work from around 118–119 AD is recorded in inscriptions and visible archaeologically; it was not completed until the reign of Commodus. The city was an early member of Hadrian's Panhellenion and a long inscription records its attempts to block membership for one of its neighbours. Cyrene was once again prosperous by the third quarter of the second century AD and several palaces date to this period, including the House of Jason Magnus.

In the mid-third century AD, Cyrene's economy began to decline. This was hastened by an earthquake of 262, which destroyed much of the city. After the disaster, the city was raided by the Marmaritae, Libyan nomads, who were defeated in 269 by Tenagino Probus, prefect of Egypt. The emperor Claudius Gothicus restored Cyrene, naming it Claudiopolis. Many buildings were subsequently rebuilt, but a hurriedly built new defensive wall enclosed only the western half of the city. The civic hub shifted north from the street of Battus to the Valley street and many of the old public spaces were filled in with housing and shops. In the reforms of Diocletian, Cyrene became part of the new province of Libya Superior (also called Pentapolis)，but the capital had become Ptolemais. The Roman Martyrology mentions under 4 July a tradition that in the persecution of Diocletian a bishop Theodorus of Cyrene was scourged and had his tongue cut out. Earlier editions of the Martyrology mentioned what may be the same person also under 26 March.

=== Byzantine period ===
Another earthquake destroyed the city on 21 July 365. Skeletons crushed by falling masonry have been found and one tomb inscription mentions the earthquake. A contemporary historian, Ammianus Marcellinus, describes Cyrene as "an ancient but deserted city". However, the damage may have been over-emphasised. Archaeology shows that most buildings were damaged, but also that many were rebuilt, including many temples, which were only closed by the Theodosian decrees in 395. Settlement seems to have expanded east beyond Claudius Gothicus' fortification wall and a generation after the earthquake, Cyrene was a significant centre. Synesius, a wealthy magnate who became bishop of Ptolemais and whose letters are preserved, grew up in Cyrene in the generation after the earthquake. Letter 67 of Synesius tells of an irregular episcopal ordination carried out by a bishop Philo of Cyrene, which was condoned by Athanasius. The same letter mentions that a nephew of this Philo, who bore the same name, also became bishop of Cyrene.

The Central and East Churches were built in the fifth or sixth century AD and renovated several times. A bishop of Cyrene name Rufus attended the Robber Council of Ephesus in 449 and there was still a bishop of Cyrene, named Leontius, at the time of Patriarch Eulogius of Alexandria (580–607). The city fell under Arab conquest in 643. At some point thereafter it was abandoned, but the ancient name lived on as "Grennah" in the 19th century.

=== Modern history ===
The site was totally abandoned in the early modern period. Frederick and Richard Beechey visited and produced the first site plans in 1821–1822. The French consul at Benghazi looted part of a tomb later in the century for the Louvre. The first systematic excavations were undertaken by Robert Murdoch Smith and E. A. Porcher in 1860 and 1861; their findings mostly went to the British Museum. They include the Apollo of Cyrene and a unique bronze head of an African man.

In 1909, the Jewish Territorial Organization, a newly formed Zionist group also known as the ITO, led by Israel Zangwill, briefly considered the region known as Cyrenaica as the possible site for a Jewish homeland. But when it was discovered that the region was basically "waterless" and that even irrigation would be impossible, the desperately hopeful plans were immediately abandoned.

The American Richard Norton began more scientific excavations in 1910, which were halted by the Italian invasion of Libya in 1911. The tomb of the excavation's epigrapher, Herbert de Cou, who was shot in mysterious circumstances, is located on the site.

The Italian colonial government established a military base at the site in 1913. In the course of building the base, Italian soldiers found the "Venus of Cyrene", a headless marble statue representing the goddess Venus, a Roman copy of a Greek original, which prompted them to restrict their base to the Acropolis. The statue was transported to Rome, where it remained until 2008, when it was returned to Libya. The village of Shahat grew up on the site as a result of the Italian presence.

The Italians created an antiquities service and, after the discovery of the Venus of Cyrene, carried out excavations at Cyrene on a very large scale, which were closely connected with the regime's propaganda. The Italian archaeologists were expelled in 1943 when the Allies captured Cyrenaica. Richard Goodchild, controller of antiquities from 1955 to 1966 moved the village of Shahat off the site and re-established it to the south; it has since expanded over much of the southern necropolis. He also restored control of excavations at the site to the Italians, under Sandro Stucchi. Goodchild also The Italian mission has excavated much of the site and restored several buildings through the process of anastylosis.

The site was declared a UNESCO World Heritage Site in 1982. Beginning in 2006, the Global Heritage Fund, in partnership with the Second University of Naples (SUN, Italy), the Libyan Department of Antiquities, and the Libyan Ministry of Culture, worked to preserve the ancient site through a combination of holistic conservation practices and training of local skilled and unskilled labor. The GHF-led team conducted ongoing emergency conservation on the theater inside the Sanctuary of Apollo.

In 2017 UNESCO added Cyrene to its List of World Heritage in Danger.

== Archaeological site ==
Cyrene is now an archaeological site north of the village of Shahhat and east of Bayda, on a ridge of the Jabal Akhdar, about 600 metres above sea level. The southern edge of the ridge and the city is formed by the Wadi Bil Ghadir and the northern edge by the Wadi Bu Turqiyah. The Acropolis, at the western edge of the ridge, was the original centre of Greek occupation. From there, a road referred to by modern scholars as the "Street of Battus" or "Skyrotà" runs along the ridge to the southeast for around 1 kilometre, past the Agora, the House of Jason Magnus and a number of other palatial residences, the Stoa of Hermes and Heracles, the Caesareum, two theatres, a sacred area, and the caravanserai until it reaches the gates of the city. Below the Acropolis to the north, the Springs of Apollo and Cyra emerge from the cliff-face onto a triangular plateau at the base of the Wadi Bu Turqiyah. This plateau contains the Greek Theatre, the Sanctuary of Apollo, and the Baths of Trajan. From the sanctuary, a road known as "Valley Street" leads southeast up the Wadi Bu Turqiyah, roughly parallel to the "Street of Battus", lined by a stepped portico and the Aqua Augusta, past the Baths of Paris to the Market Theatre and the Central Quarter, which contains several public buildings and palatial residences. To the northeast, on another ridge, but still inside the city walls, is the largely unexcavated northeastern quarter, containing the Temple of Zeus, the hippodrome, and the East Church. Outside the city walls to the south is the Sanctuary of Demeter and Persephone. The necropolis of Cyrene covers about 20 km² to the south and north of the city.

Archaeological finds are stored and displayed in a temporary museum in the eastern portion of the site. In 2005, Italian archaeologists from the University of Urbino discovered 76 intact Roman statues at Cyrene from the 2nd century AD. The statues remained undiscovered for so long because "during the earthquake of 375 AD, a supporting wall of the temple fell on its side, burying all the statues. They remained hidden under stone, rubble and earth for 1,630 years. The other walls sheltered the statues, so we were able to recover all the pieces, even works that had been broken."

=== Acropolis ===
The Acropolis lies to the West of the Agora and South of the Sanctuary of Apollo at the Western end of the Route of Skyrota also known as the Street of Battus. The acropolis was the location of the Royal Palace and the source of the sacred spring, known as the Fountain of Apollo, which ran through the sanctuary of Apollo to the North.

=== Agora ===
The Agora lies in the centre of the city with an Eastern and Western Stoa, as well as several temples such as the Temple of Apollo Archegetes.

=== Sanctuary of Apollo ===
One of its more significant features is the temple of Apollo, which was originally constructed as early as 7th century BC. Other ancient structures include a temple to Demeter. There is a large necropolis approximately 10 km between Cyrene and its ancient port of Apollonia.

=== Temple of Zeus ===
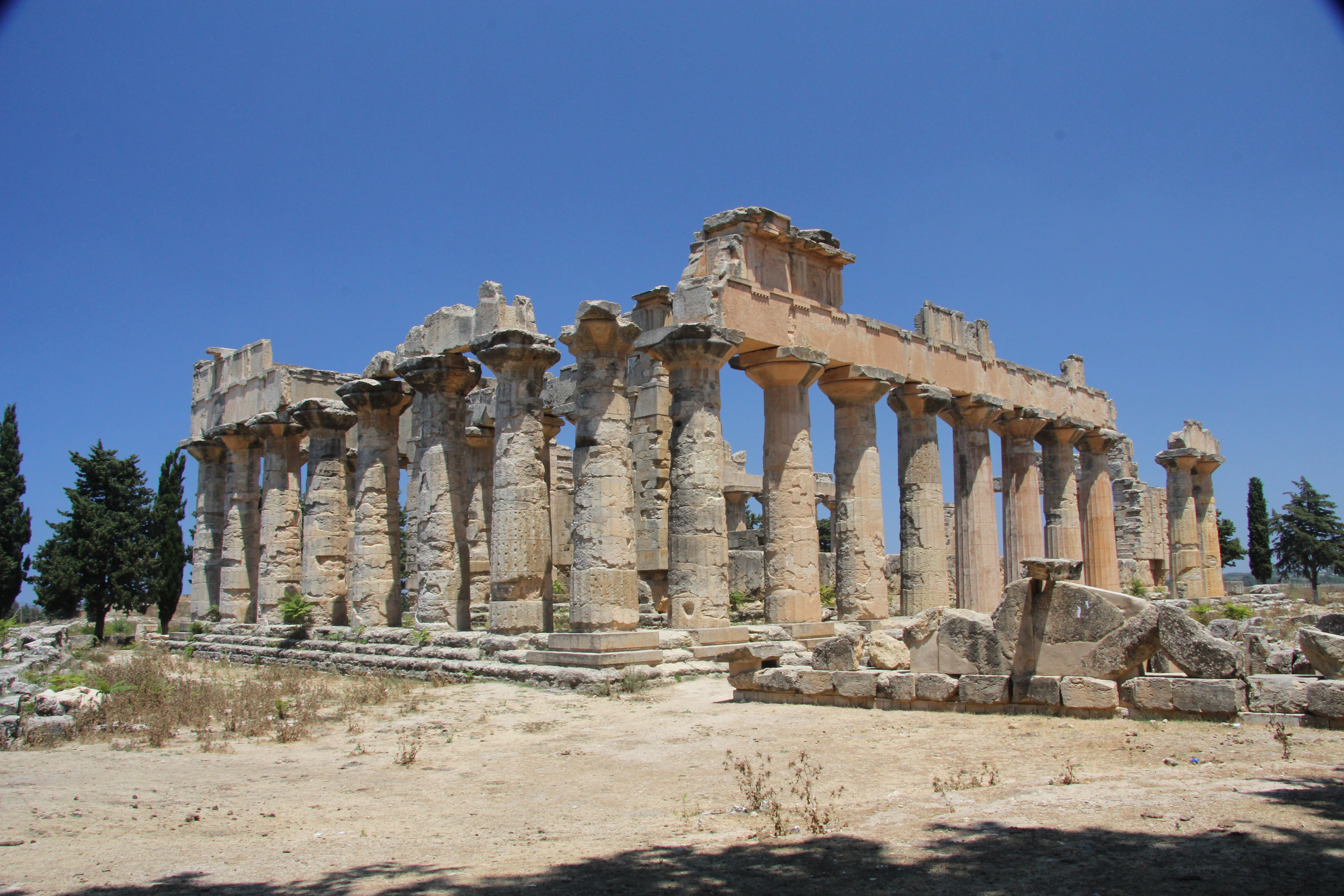
The reconstructed temple of Zeus, seen from the southwest.

The Temple of Zeus was the largest ancient Greek temple at Cyrene, and one of the largest Greek temples ever built. The original Doric octastyle peripteral temple was constructed around 500–480 BC, It faced east and stood atop a three-stepped crepidoma, with a length of 68.3 metres and a width of 30.4 metres, making it roughly the same size as the Temple of Zeus at Olympia and the Parthenon at Athens. The front porch (pronaos) was supported by two columns in antis; the back porch (opisthodomos) by three columns in antis. The cella was two stories high and two rows of columns divided it into three aisles. The external colonnade (peripteros) has eight columns at the front and rear and seventeen columns on each of the long sides. It was destroyed in 115 AD during the Jewish sack of the city. Around 172–175 AD it was partially rebuilt as a non-peripteral temple. Between 185 and 192 AD, a colossal cult statue, modelled on the Statue of Zeus at Olympia was installed. The temple was destroyed once more in 365 AD by an earthquake and then burnt by Christians.

=== Sanctuary of Demeter and Persephone ===
The sanctuary to Demeter and Persephone, which includes a temple and theater complex, is located south of the Wadi Bil Ghadir ravine, outside the city walls. The Sanctuary comprised structures sprawled out over twenty miles and are divided into three terraces: the Lower, Middle and Upper Sanctuaries. The archaeological remains date from the late seventh century BC to the mid-third century AD. During the time of this sacred activity at the Sanctuary a voluminous amount of votive material was accumulated in its interior: pottery, lamps, coinage, stone sculpture, jewellery, inscriptions, glass, as well as bronze and terracotta figurines. The pottery excavated at the Sanctuary provides useful evidence concerning both the question of its foundation and type of religious activity.

=== Necropolis ===
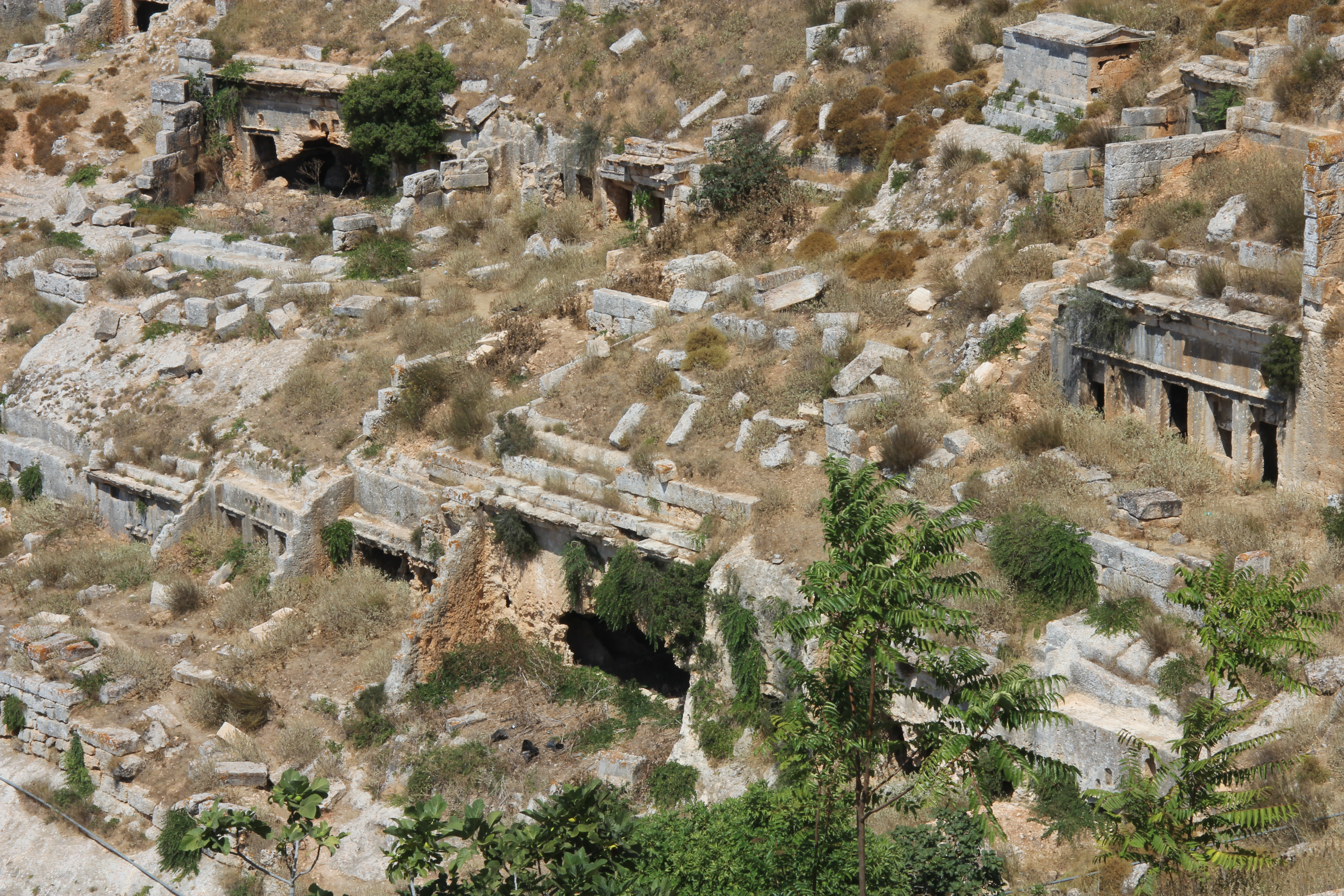
Rock-cut tombs in the necropolis of Cyrene.

The necropolis consists of graves, rock-cut tombs, temple-tombs, and sarcophagi, dating from the sixth century BC until the fifth century AD. It covers about 20 km² to the south and north of the city, making it one of the largest known Greek necropoleis. The southern section has been encroached upon by the growing city of Shahat, especially after 2013, when many tombs were bulldozed. The northern portion is better preserved. Several of the tombs of the Roman period have niches for portrait busts of the deceased. A common find are statues of the so-called "Goddess of Death", a female bust – often faceless – depicted in the process of unveiling herself.

=== Water system ===
In October 2023, a flood exposed a water canal, possibly dating back to the Roman era.

== Philosophy ==
Cyrene contributed to the intellectual life of the Greeks, through renowned philosophers and mathematicians. The School of Cyrene, known as the Cyrenaics, developed here as a minor Socratic school founded by Aristippus (perhaps the friend of Socrates, though according to some accounts a grandson of Aristippus with the same name).

== Notable people ==
- Aretaphila of Cyrene, noblewoman
- Arete of Cyrene, philosopher
- Aristippus (c. 435 – c. 356 BC), philosopher and founder of the Cyrenaic School
- Carneades, Academic skeptic philosopher
- Callicratidas, a general
- Callimachus (310/305 – 240 BC), poet, critic, and scholar at the Library of Alexandria
- Cratisthenes of Cyrene, an Olympic winner at chariot-race. There was a statue of him at Olympia, created by Pythagoras.
- Eratosthenes (276 – 194 BC), mathematician, geographer, astronomer; librarian at the Library of Alexandria. First to calculate the circumference of the Earth
- Eugammon (fl. 6th century BC), epic poet
- Hippon of Cyrene, an ancient Olympic winner at pankration. He won at 280 B.C.
- Idaeus of Cyrene, an ancient Olympic winner at foot-race. He won at 275 B.C.
- Lacydes (3rd century BC), philosopher
- Philostephanus, Hellenistic writer
- Ptolemais, philosopher of music
- Simon of Cyrene, the man who helped carry the cross of Jesus
- Synesius (c. 373 – c. 414 AD), author and bishop of Ptolemais
- Theodorus (c. 5th century BC), mathematician
- Theaetetus of Cyrene, poet

=== List of bishops ===
Known bishops of the town include

- Saint Luke by tradition
- Theodoro (fl. 302)
- Filo I (fl. 370 circa)
- Filo II (fl.370 circa)
- Rufo (fl.449)
- Leontius (fl.600 circa)

No longer a residential bishopric, Cyrene is today listed by the Catholic Church as a titular see. The Greek Orthodox Church has also treated it as a titular see.

== Gallery ==
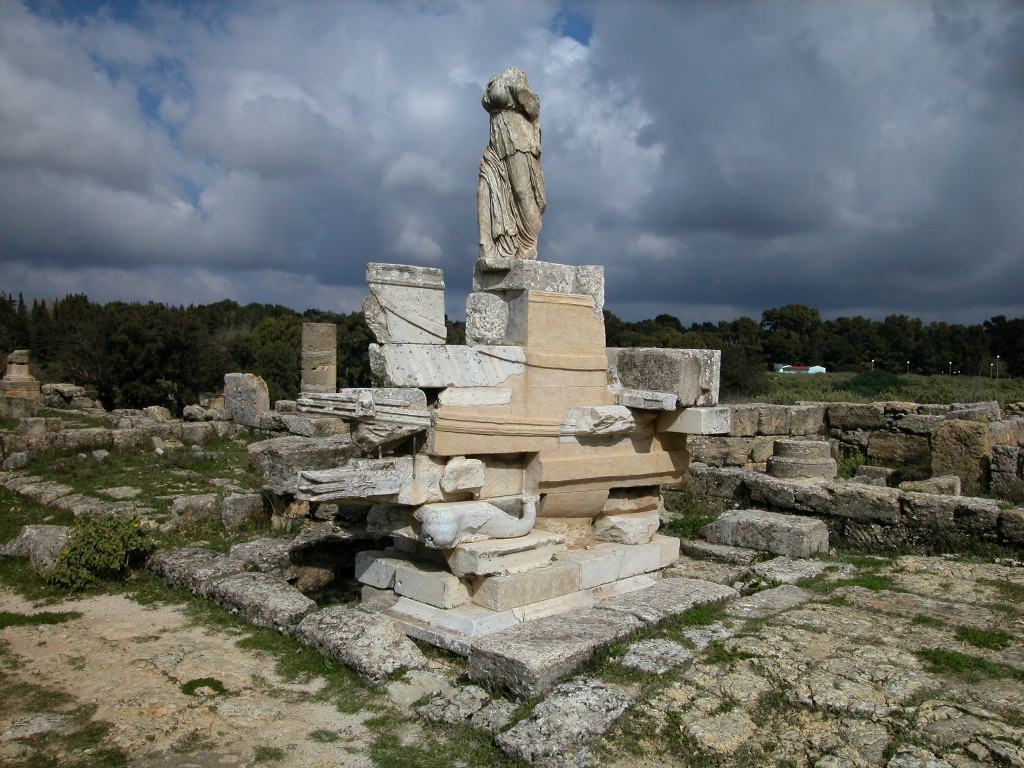
Agora Victory Monument

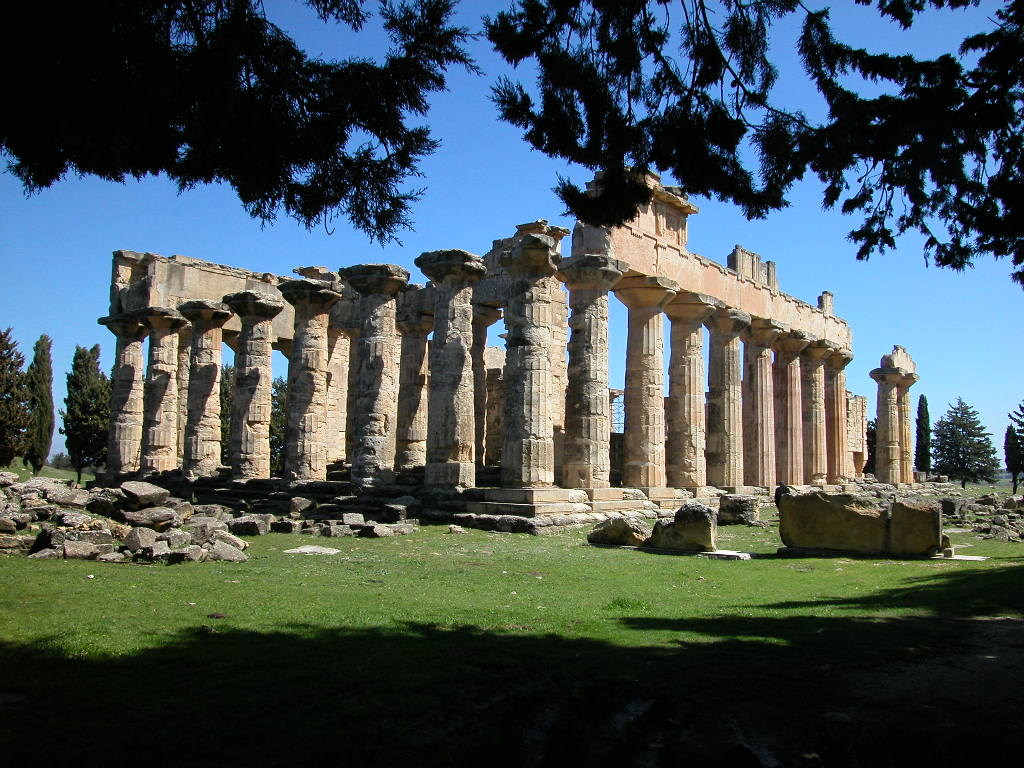
The Temple of Zeus

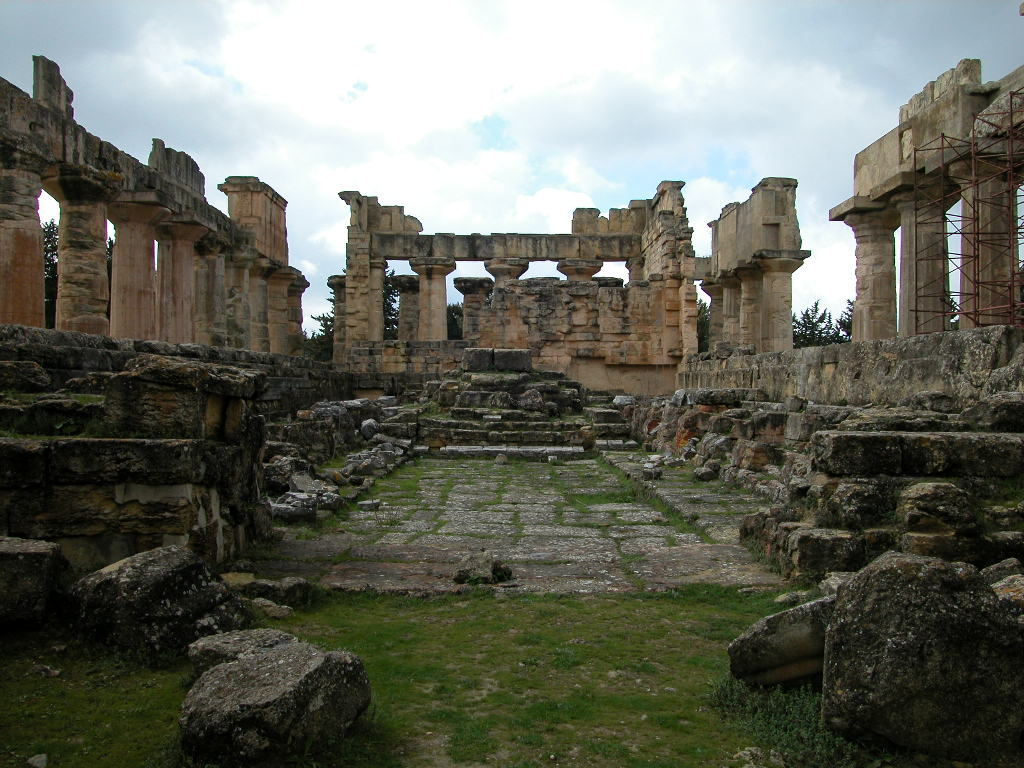
The Temple of Zeus

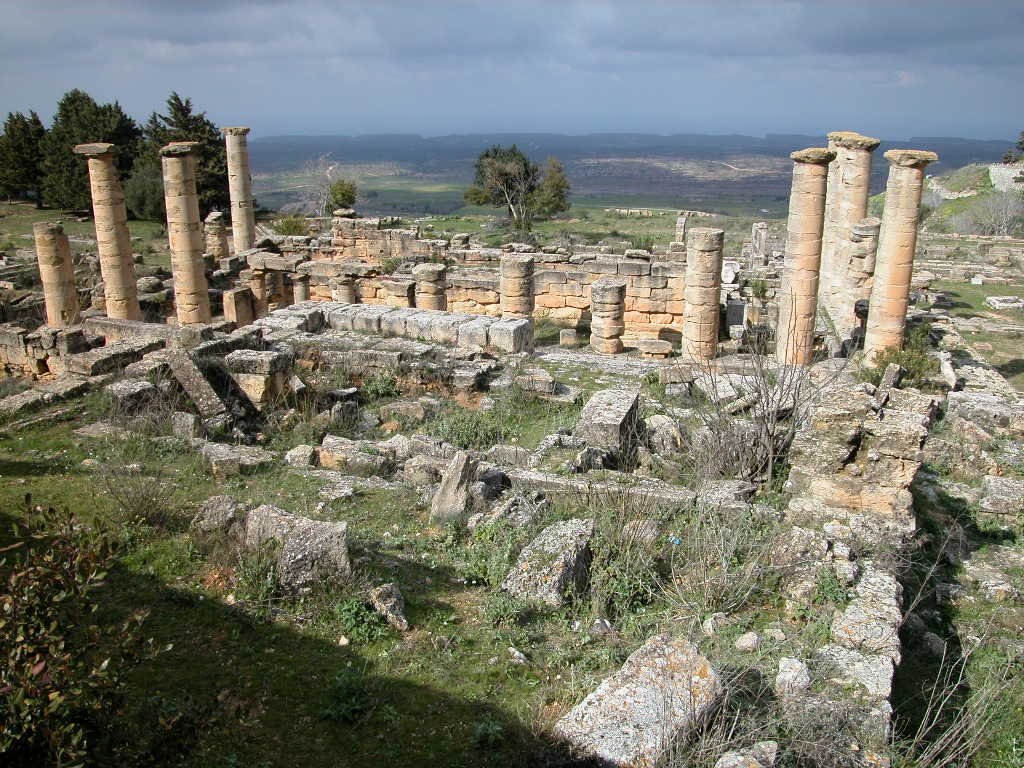
The Temple of Apollo

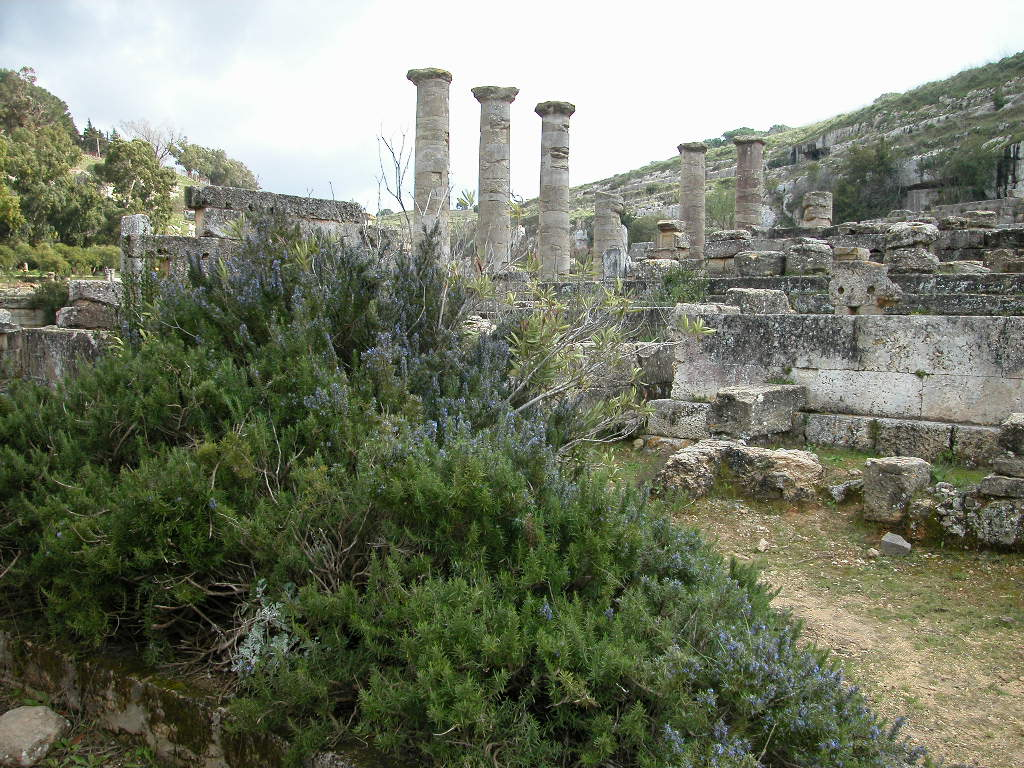
The Temple of Apollo

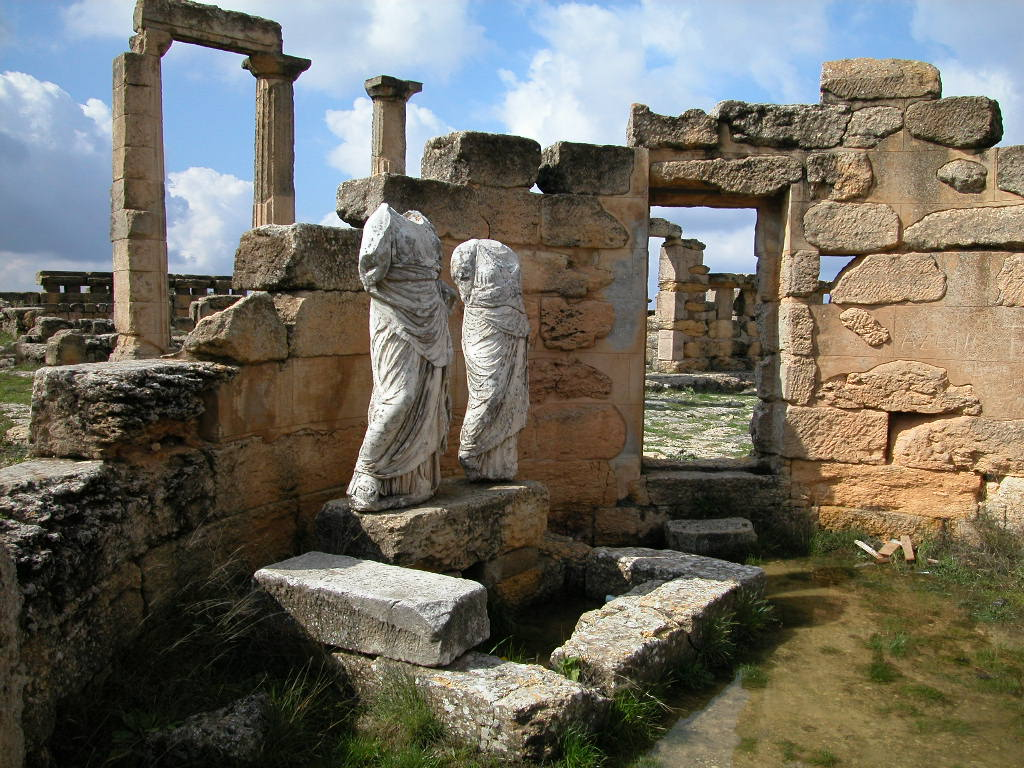
The Tomb of Battus

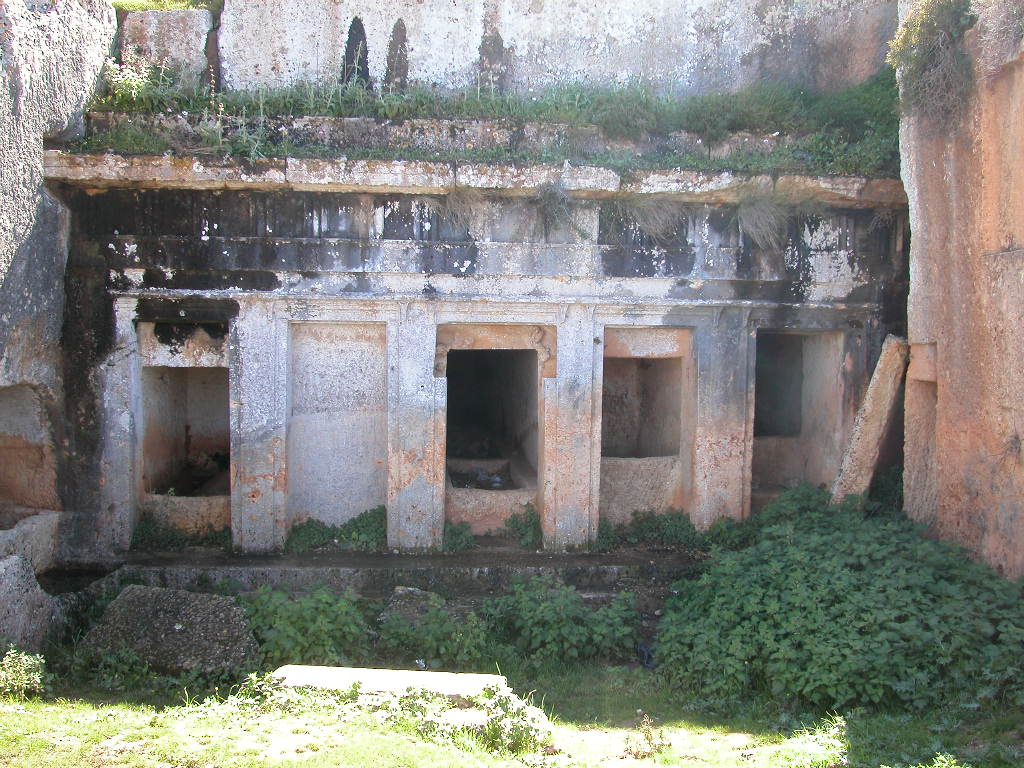

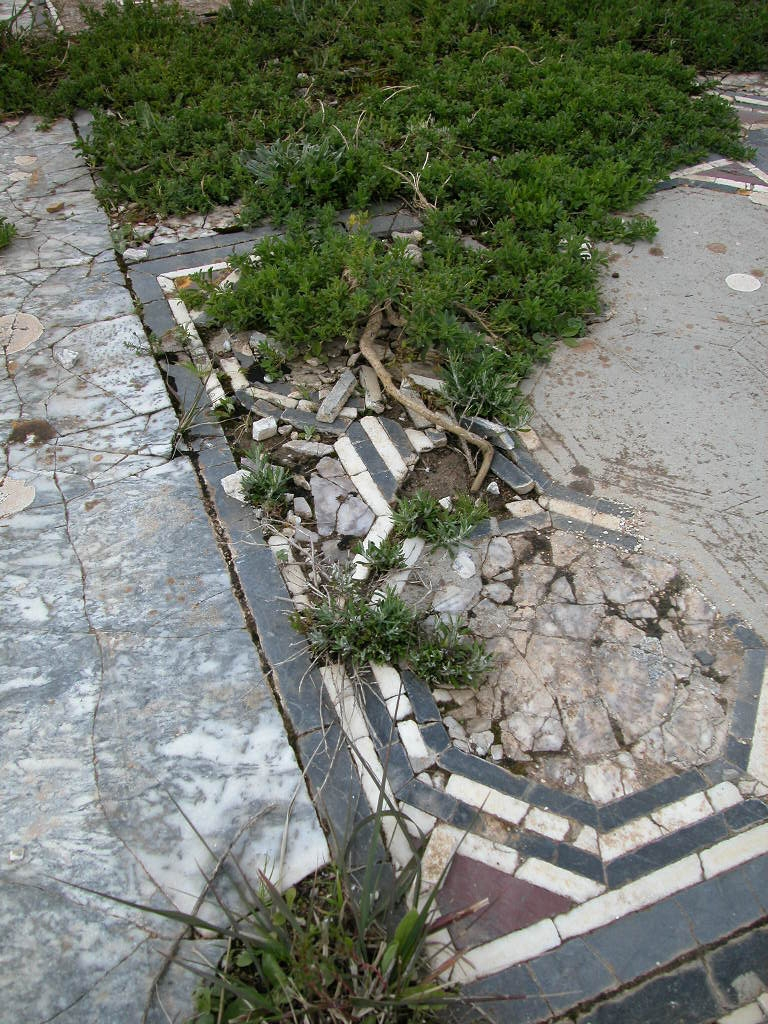

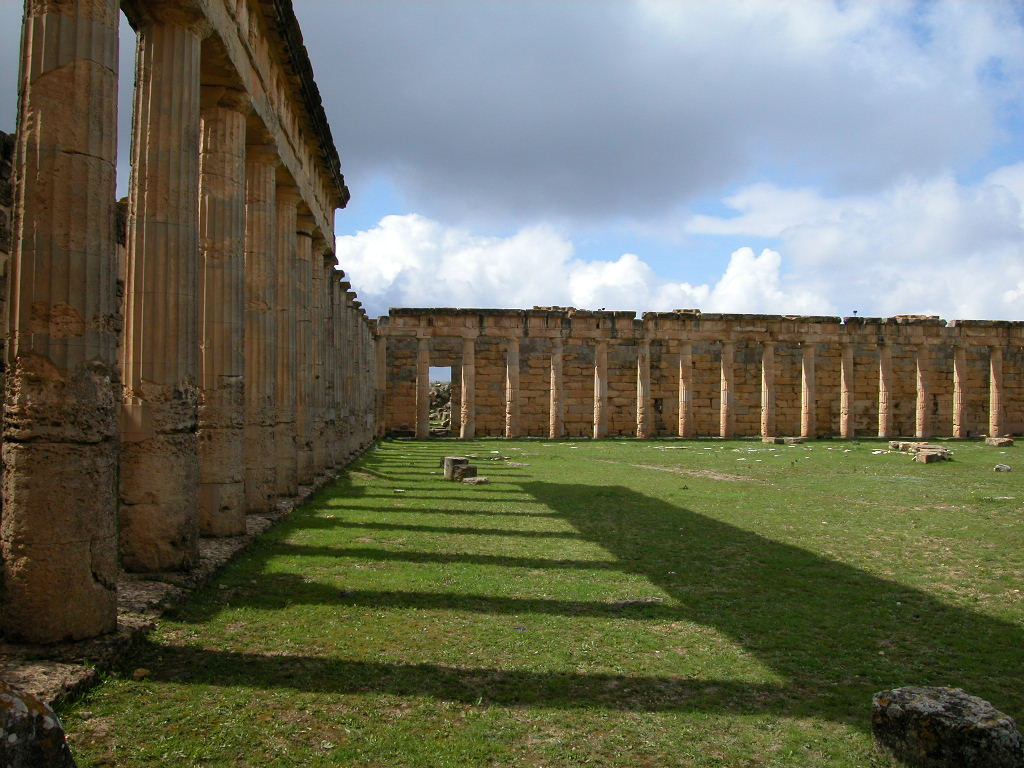

== See also ==
- Cyrenaica
- Cyrenaics
- List of Kings of Cyrene
- Priest of Apollo (Cyrene)
- Extramural Sanctuary of Demeter and Persephone at Cyrene, Libya

== Bibliography ==
- Asolati, Michele; Crisafulli, Cristina (2018). Cirene e la Cirenaica in età greca e romana. Roma: "L'Erma" di Bretschneider. ISBN 9788891317155.
- Cariddi, Lorenzo (2020). Cirene e l'acqua: ricerche e documenti sulla gestione delle risorse idriche in città e nella chora. Roma: "L'Erma" di Bretschneider. ISBN 9788891319623.
- Clayton, Peter A. (2006). Chronicles of the Pharaohs: the reign-by-reign record of the rulers and dynasties of ancient Egypt. Thames & Hudson. ISBN 0-500-28628-0.
- Dinsmoor, William Bell (1950). The Architecture of Ancient Greece: An Account of Its Historic Development. Biblo & Tannen Publishers. ISBN 978-0-8196-0283-1.
- Goodchild, Richard George (1971). Kyrene und Apollonia (in German). Zurich: Raggi.
- Goodchild, R. G.; Reynolds, J. M.; Herington, C. J. (1958). "The Temple of Zeus at Cyrene". Papers of the British School at Rome. 26: 30–62. doi:10.1017/S0068246200007054. ISSN 0068-2462. JSTOR 40310596.
- Grainger, John D. (2010). The Syrian Wars. Brill. ISBN 9789004180505.
- Hölbl, Günther (2001). A History of the Ptolemaic Empire. London & New York: Routledge. pp. 143–152 & 181–194. ISBN 0415201454.
- Kenrick, Philip (2013). Cyrenaica. Libya Archaeological Guides. Vol. 2. Silphium Press. ISBN 978-1-900971-14-0.
- Laronde, Andre (1987). "Cyrène et la Libye hellénistique, Libykai Historiai : de l'époque républicaine au principat d'Auguste". Études d'Antiquités Africaines. 2 (1). Éditions du Centre National de la Recherche Scientifique.
- Luni, Mario (2014). La scoperta di Cirene: un secolo di scavi (1913–2013). Roma: "L'Erma" di Bretschneider. ISBN 9788891306425.
- Poli Fabrice, Vottéro Guy, De Cyrène à Catherine : trois mille ans de libyennes, Nancy, ADRA, 2005, 464p.
- Rosamilia, Emilio (2023). La città del silfio. Istituzioni, culti ed economia di Cirene classica ed ellenistica attraverso le fonti epigrafiche [The City of Silphium. Institutions, Cults, and Economy of Classical and Hellenistic Cyrene through Epigraphic Sources] (in Italian). Pisa: Scuola Normale Superiore. ISBN 9788876427367.
- Rosenbaum, Elizabeth; Ward-Perkins, John (1980). Justinianic mosaic pavements in Cyrenaican Churches. Rome: Bretschneider. ISBN 9788891323729.
- Sachs, Gerd (2019). Alt-Thera und Kyrene – zwei verwandte griechische Städte. Mythos, Geschichte, Kultur. Antiquitates, vol 71. Hamburg: Verlag Dr. Kovač, ISBN 978-3-339-10636-0.
- Stucchi, Sandro (1976). Architettura cirenaica. Rome: Bretschneider. ISBN 887062448X.
- Thorn, James Copland (2005). The Necropolis of Cyrene: two hundred years of exploration. Roma: "L'Erma" di Bretschneider. ISBN 9788882653392.

Excavation reports

- Stucchi, Sandro (1965). L'Agorà di Cirene. I: I lati nord ed est della platea inferiore (in Italian). L'Erma di Bretchneider. ISBN 9788870624472.
- Bacchielli, Lidiano (1981). L'Agorà di Cirene. II,1: L' area settentrionale del lato ovest della platea inferiore / F. Martelli. Roma: Bretschneider. ISBN 9788870625028.
- Purcaro, Valeria (2001). L'Agorà di Cirene. II,3: L' area meridionale del lato ovest dell'agorà / Valeria Purcaro. Roma: Bretschneider. ISBN 9788882651169.
- Bacchielli, Lidiano; Stucchi, Sandro (1983). L'Agorà di Cirene. II,4: Il lato sud della platea inferiore e il lato nord della terrazza superiore / Sandro Stucchi; Lidiano Bacchielli. Con contributi di G. Lepore. Roma: Bretschneider. ISBN 9788870625387.
- Ermeti, Anna Lia; Bacchielli, Lidiano (1981). L'Agorà di Cirene. III,1: Il monumento navale / Anna Lia Ermeti Allegati. Roma: "L'Erma" di Bretschneider. ISBN 9788870625035.
- Mingazzini, Paolino (1966). L'insula di Giasone Magno a Cirene. Rome: Bretschneider. ISBN 8870623742.
- Santucci, Anna; Micheli, Maria Elisa (2000). Il santuario delle nymphai chthoniai a Cirene: il sito e le terrecotte. Roma: "L'Erma" di Bretschneider. ISBN 9788882650759.
- Ghislanzoni, Ettore (1916). Gli scavi delle terme romane a Cirene (in Italian). Alfieri.
- Pernier, Luigi (1935). Il tempio e l'altare di Apollo a Cirene: scavi e studi dal 1925 al 1934 (in Italian). Istituto Italiano dÁrti Grafiche.
