= Erythron =

Erythron may refer to:

- the sum of all red blood cells in the body
- the ancient town of Erythrum in modern-day Libya
