= Ptolemais, Cyrenaica =

One of the ancient capitals of Cyrenaica

Ptolemais
- Πτολεμαΐς (Greek)
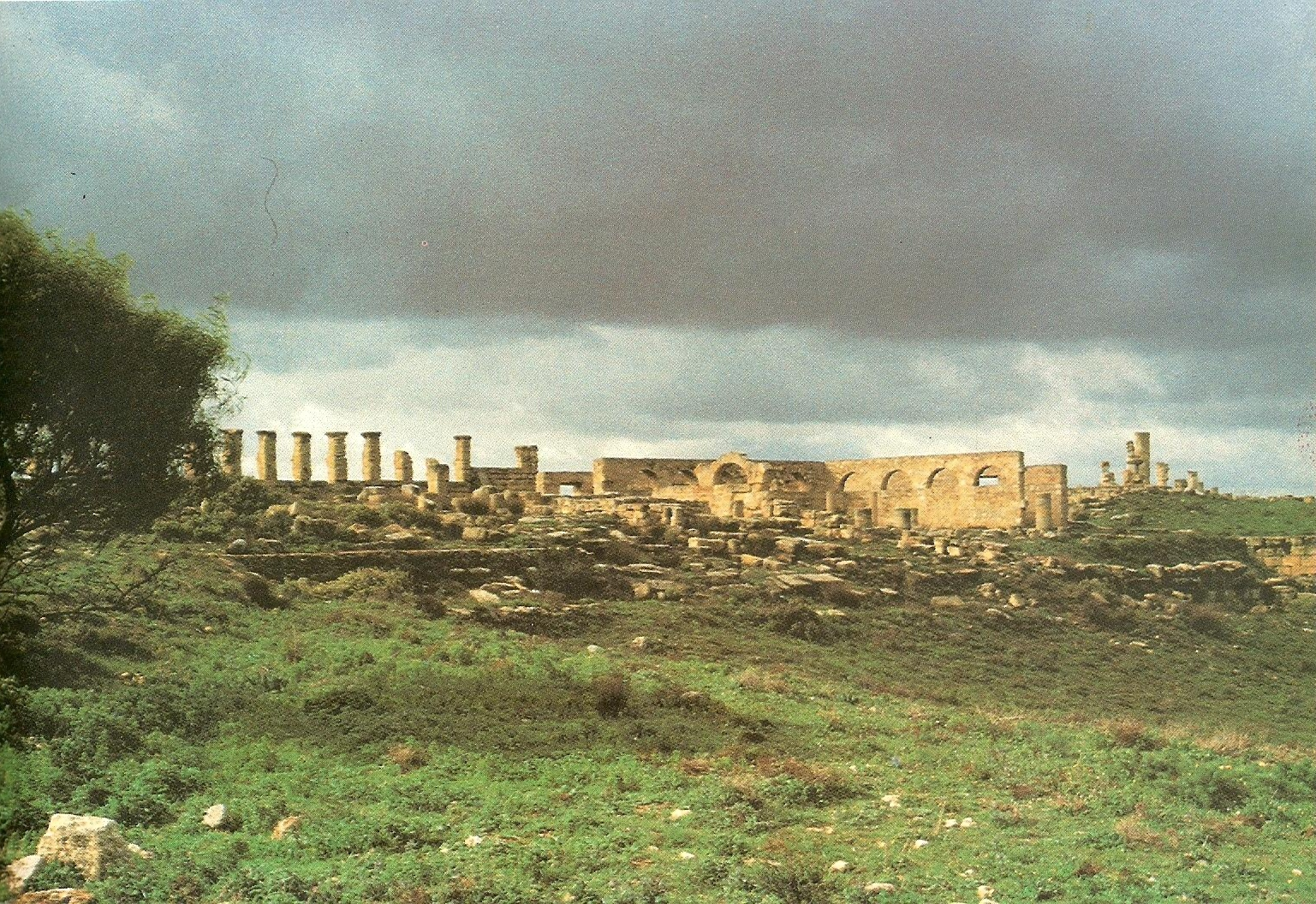
- Ruins of Ptolemais

- Location within Libya
- 32.7069°N 20.9529°E
- Type: Settlement
- Periods: Hellenistic period to Byzantine Empire
- Location: Near Tolmeita, Libya
- Region: Cyrenaica

History
- Built: 3rd century BC
- Abandoned: 7th century AD

Site notes
- Condition: In ruins

Ptolemais (Greek: Πτολεμαΐς) was one of the five cities that formed the Pentapolis of Cyrenaica, the others being Cyrene, Euesperides (later known as Berenice, now Benghazi), Tauchira/Teuchira (later Arsinoe, and now Tocra), and Apollonia (now Susa).

Its ruins are at a small village in modern Libya called Tolmeita (Arabic طلميتة), after the ancient name.

== History ==
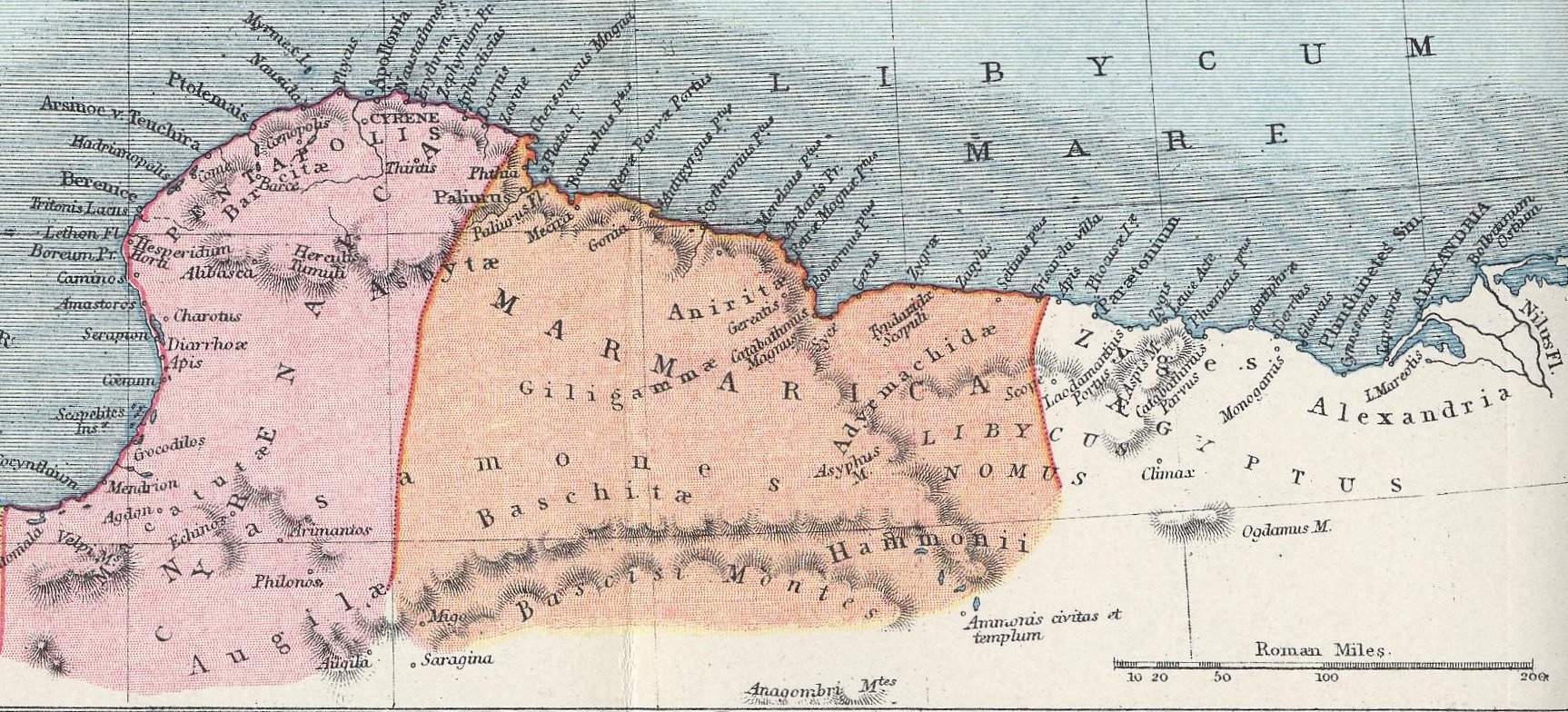
Map of Roman Cyrenaica and Marmarica

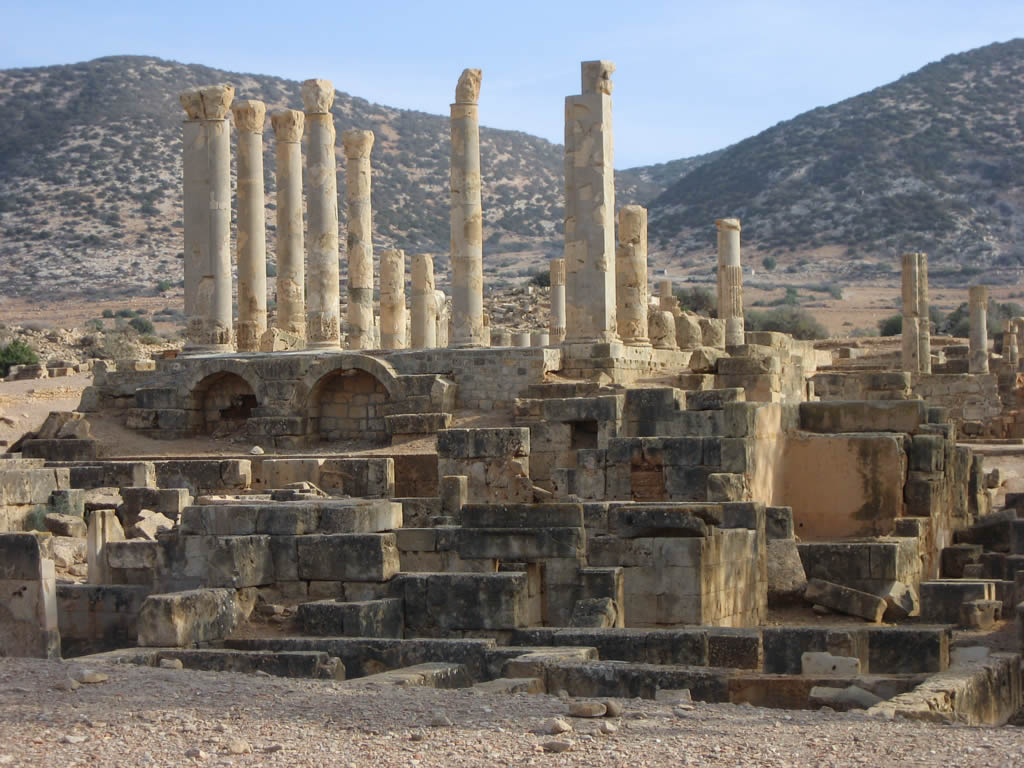
Ptolemais ruins

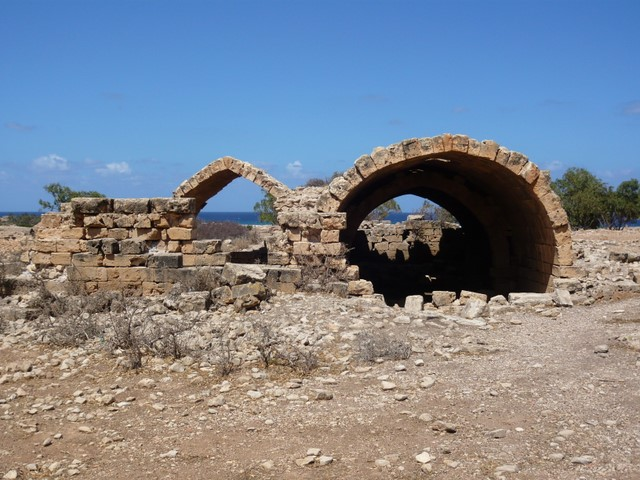
Cistern

The city was founded by and named after one of the rulers of the Ptolemaic Kingdom, probably Ptolemy III Euergetes (246–221 BC). What had been a small Greek settlement of unknown name that originated in the late 7th century BC and that acted as a port for the city of Barca, 24 kilometres (15 mi) inland, he transformed into a city that enclosed 280 hectares within its walls. Ptolemais probably served as the residence of the Ptolemaic governor of the region but, in spite of its large area, its population did not rival that of Cyrene, which under Roman rule became the capital of the region that, from then on, and still today, is called Cyrenaica. However, the term "Pentapolis" also continued to be used.

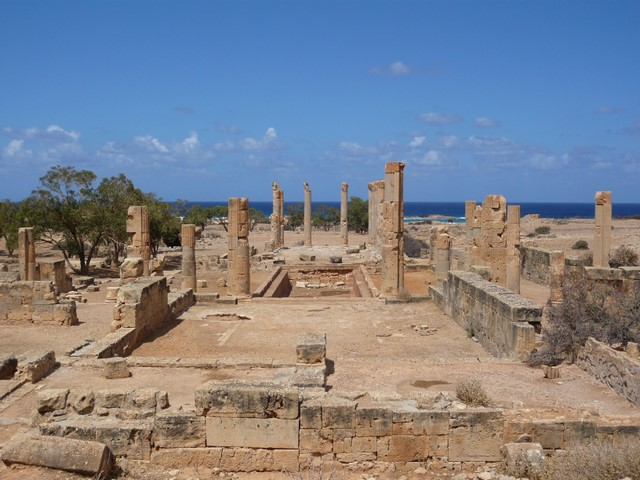
Palazzo delle Colonne ("Palace of the Columns"), a Hellenistic-period mansion, possibly serving as the residence of the local governor

Ptolemais became a Roman possession in 96 BC. It was soon included in the Roman province of Crete and Cyrenaica. With Diocletian's alteration of the administrative structure, Ptolemais became the capital of the province of Libya Superior or Libya Pentapolis. It later decayed and was replaced as capital of the province by Apollonia.

The 365 Crete earthquake struck the region and destroyed all the five major cities of the Pentapolis. Ptolemais survived the tragedy in relatively good condition. It served as capital of Cyrenaica until 428. The city was destroyed by the Libyans in 411. During the reign of Justinian I the city was rebuilt, but it never regained its powers and was again destroyed during the Muslim conquest of the Maghreb in the 7th century.

== Remains ==
Buried in the sands, the town's ruins have been remarkably well preserved. Excavation of the site began in the 1930s, revealing a planned city of rectangular shape, some 1650 by 1400 metres (about one square mile) and composed of blocks of about 180 by 36 metres. It held a hippodrome, an amphitheatre, and three theatres, the smallest of which, used as an odeon, was adapted for water spectacles in the 4th or 5th century.

Near the city's agora is Palazzo delle Colonne ("Palace of the Columns"), a large Hellenistic-period mansion identified as the residence of the city’s governor from the late Hellenistic period through the Roman and Byzantine eras. Built in the 2nd or 1st century BC and continuously occupied and thereafter, the complex functioned as an elite domus (urban housing). Its most elaborate part, the central sector, is organized around a grand open-air peristyle with two tiers of columns (28 in total), later enhanced with a large pool, and flanked by dining rooms and living quarters with mosaics, marble revetments, and wall paintings; to the north lies a roofed quadriportico (a space surrounded on four sides by porticoes) supported by a vaulted cryptoporticus. Additional sectors include a western wing, probably women's quarters, a private bath complex with frigidarium, tepidarium, and caldarium, tabernae fronting the street, and a self-contained eastern area interpreted as housing for guards or minor officials.

A Roman aqueduct, probably of the time of Hadrian, brought water from more than 8 km away, which was stored in two large open reservoirs in the east of the city, while further west a porticoed space, now called the Square of the Cisterns, stood above a set of seventeen vaulted cisterns, capable of holding 7,000 cubic meters. These were rediscovered during the Italian occupation, when they were found to be used as a refuge for rebels, two or three hundred of whom could easily hide in them.

West of the city stands a conspicuous and tower-like Hellenistic mausoleum, known as Qasr Faraoun. There are many chamber tombs in the quarries east and west of the city, which have yielded a few tombstones and numerous inscriptions. Important sculptures and inscriptions have also been found within the city, including imperial edicts such as the Edict on Maximum Prices, the edict of Diocletian in 301 AD, by which he attempted to fix prices.

In 2001 an archaeological mission from Warsaw University started excavations on the site.

In May 2011, a number of objects excavated from Ptolemais in 1937 and held in the vault of the National Commercial Bank in Benghazi were stolen. Looters tunnelled into the vault and broke into two safes that held the artifacts which were part of the so-called Benghazi Treasure. The objects have not been traced.

== Bishopric ==
The Ptolemais of Libya, whose ruins are located near the Libyan city of Tolmeita, was also the Seat of the ancient Christian bishopric of Libya Pentapolitana.

Ptolemais became a Catholic Church diocese at an early stage, since it seems to have been the see of the Pentapolitan bishop Basilides to whom, in a letter of about 260 quoted by Eusebius, Pope Dionysius of Alexandria said he had sent a copy of a commentary on Ecclesiastes. Another early bishop of Ptolemais is Saint Theodore of Sykeon, martyred during the anti-Christian persecutions.

The First Council of Nicaea confirmed the custom whereby the bishop of Alexandria held authority over the churches in the Pentapolis, although they were not situated in the same Roman province. Accordingly, none of the bishoprics in the Pentapolis was a metropolitan see for the others, but all acted as suffragan bishops of Alexandria.

Ptolemais was the home of Arius, after whom the Arianism condemned at Nicaea in 325 was named. Secundus, who was bishop of Ptolemais and a patron of Arius, is listed among those present at the council. He refused to accept its decree and was deposed by the bishop of Alexandria, but later recovered power. His Arian successor Stephanus was deposed in about 360.

Synesius was bishop of Ptolemais from about 407 to 413, and was succeeded by his brother Evoptius, who took part in the Council of Ephesus (431), which condemned Nestorius. The acts of the Second Council of Constantinople (553) were signed by Georgius of Ptolemais. The last bishop of Ptolemais mentioned by the sources is Gabriel (6th century), the signing Archbishop Gabrielis Pentapolis. Information on all of these can be found, for instance, in Michel Le Quien's work.

No longer a residential bishopric, Ptolemais in Libya is today listed by the Catholic Church as a titular see. The current archbishop, personal title, is Cyril Vasiľ, secretary of the Congregation for the Oriental Churches.

=== Known Bishops ===
- Basilide (mentioned in about 260)
- Saint Theodorus (before 321– 25 deposited) (Aryan Bishop)
- Secundus of Ptolemais (about 325) (Aryan Bishop)
- Stefanus (about 360 deposed) (Aryan Bishop)
- Siderio (apostolic administrator)
- Synesius (about 407–413)
- Euoptius (mentioned in 431)
- Giorgio (mentioned in 553)
- Gabriele
- Raffaele Virili (1915–1925)
- Cesare Orsenigo (1922–1946)
- Carlo Angeleri (1948–1979)
- Cyril Vasiľ (from 2009–current)
