= Basilides (bishop of Ptolemais) =

3rd century Christian bishop

Basilides or Basileides (Ancient Greek: Βασιλείδης) was a Christian bishop of Ptolemais in the Pentapolis of Cyrenaica. He lived in the 3rd century CE.

He was a contemporary and friend of Pope Dionysius of Alexandria, to whom he wrote numerous letters. These letters of Basilides are now lost, but the answers of Dionysius remain, several of which are quoted by 3rd-century historian of Christianity Eusebius.

The 17th-century scholar William Cave believed that Basilides had been an Egyptian by birth, and he places him at the year 256 CE.
