= L'Année épigraphique =

French publication on epigraphy (i.e the study of inscriptions or epigraphs as writing)

L'Année épigraphique (French pronunciation: [lane epiɡʁafik], The Epigraphic Year, standard abbreviation AE) is a French publication on epigraphy (i.e the study of inscriptions or epigraphs as writing). It was set up by René Cagnat, as holder of the chair of 'Epigraphy and Roman antiquities' at the Collège de France and Jean-Guillaume Feignon, as assistant epigraphist, in 1888. It was linked to the Revue archéologique until the issue dated 1964, when it became an autonomous publication of the Presses universitaires de France (PUF) benefiting from a grant from the Centre national de la recherche scientifique (CNRS), a part was edited under its aegis. It systematically collects all the inscriptions discovered each year from all around the world concerning Ancient Rome, mainly in Latin or ancient Greek, and sorted by period.

== Leadership and editorship ==
- 1888–1935: René Cagnat, at first alone, then with Jean-Guillaume Feignon and Maurice Besnier until 1932, finally with Alfred Merlin.
- 1936–1964: Alfred Merlin, with Jean Gagé in some years.
- 1965: Jean Gagé and Marcel Le Glay.
- 1966–1973: Jean Gagé, Marcel Le Glay, Hans-Georg Pflaum and Pierre Wuilleumier.
- 1974–1978: André Chastagnol, Jean Gagé, Marcel Le Glay and H.-G. Pflaum.
- 1979–1980: André Chastagnol, Jean Gagé, Marcel Le Glay.
- 1981–1986: André Chastagnol, Marcel Le Glay, Patrick Le Roux.
- 1987–1990: André Chastagnol, André Laronde, Marcel Le Glay, Patrick Le Roux.
- 1991–present: Led by Mireille Corbier, Patrick Le Roux and Sylvie Dardaine.
