= Palazzo delle Colonne =

Hellenistic mansion in north-eastern Libya

- Palace of the Columns
- Interactive map of Palazzo delle Colonne
- 32°42′32″N 20°57′15″E
- Type: Domus (elite residence)
- Periods: Hellenistic; Roman; Byzantine
- Location: Ptolemais, Cyrenaica, Libya
- Region: Cyrenaica

History
- Built: 2nd–1st century BC

Site notes
- Length: 165 metres (541 ft)
- Width: 37 metres (121 ft)
- Excavation dates: 1937–1942
- Archaeologists: Enrico Paribeni, Gennaro Pesce, William Andrew McDonald
- Discovered: 1937
- Identified as the residence of the city's governor

The Palazzo delle Colonne (Italian for "Palace of the Columns") is an Hellenistic-style mansion located in Ptolemais (modern Tolmeita), in the Cyrenaica region of Libya. Situated near the city's agora, the site is generally identified as the residence of the city's governor. Archaeological evidence suggests continuous habitation from the late Hellenistic period, in the 2nd or 1st century BC, through the Roman and Byzantine periods.

Architecturally, the complex is divided into distinct functional quarters, including a lavish central sector with a grand peristyle and mosaics, a private thermal complex, a western wing likely used as women's quarters, and an area interpreted as housing for guards. Excavations at the site began in 1936 but were halted in 1942 due to the Second World War; the excavator later had to publish his findings from photographs and memory after vandals destroyed the records.

== Description ==
The site is identified as a domus (private residence) rather than a public building or insula. It is situated in the central section of ancient Ptolemais, in close proximity to the agora, in a block measuring approximately 165 metres (541 ft) north-south by 37 metres (121 ft) east-west.

The building is dated to an original construction in the 2nd or 1st century BC, with continuous use and reconstruction continuing into the Roman and Byzantine periods. The site's main excavator, Gennaro Pesce, and later William Andrew McDonald, believed it to have served as the residence for a local governor, originally a Ptolemaic official and later his Roman and Byzantine successors.

=== Structure ===
The palace is divided into several sectors. The central sector, probably used for administrative roles (politics and justice), is the most elaborate. In its center is a grand, open-air peristyle, with two tiers of columns and a large pool added at a later date. The peristyle consisted of 28 columns and measured approximately 20 by 18 metres (66 ft × 59 ft). The southern section contains dining rooms, halls and living quarters decorated with the building's finest mosaics, marble revetments, and wall paintings. To its north is a large roofed quadriportico, supported by a vaulted cryptoporticus.

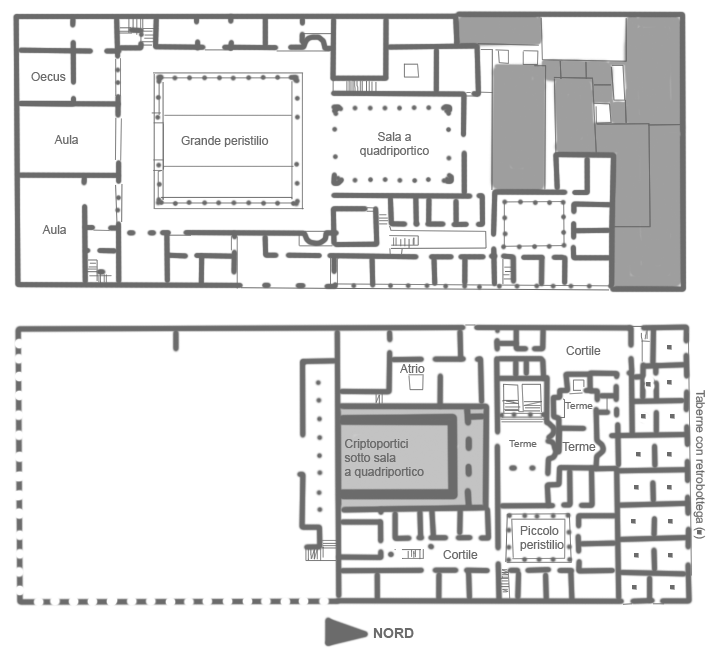
Plan of the site, showing the arrangement of spaces on the upper levels (top) and lower levels (bottom)

The western sector is located at a lower level to the west of the quadportico. It centers around a small atrium with an impulvium. It has a separate entrance and is believed to be the women's quarters. North of the quadriportico is a thermal quarter, that includes a frigidarium, tepidarium, and a caldarium with a double floor. North of the baths are shops (tabernae) facing the street. East of the main section is a self-contained area with a small peristyle (with 14 columns) and a long corridor, believed to house palace guards and minor officials. This area includes an underground room containing human skeletons, interpreted by the excavator as a prison, though possibly a family tomb.

Evidence suggests that the mansion suffered significant damage during the 365 Crete earthquake. The crushed skeletons of inhabitants attempting to flee were discovered in the central peristyle.

=== Findings ===
Recovered artifacts include Egyptian statues, some bearing hieroglyphic inscriptions, which attest to connections between Egypt and Cyrenaica. The site also yielded fragmentary Greek sculptures attributed to a local workshop, which is influenced by post-Praxitelean styles. Smaller findings include Gnathian ware skyphoi, Arretine-style pottery, lamps, and gems. Coins found include a gold stater from Cyrene and imperial Roman aurei dating as late as the reign of Trajan.

The identification of the site with the residence of a governor is supported by the discovery of a hieroglyphic inscription within the building referring to a "scribe of the palace treasury". No Greek or Latin inscriptions were recorded.

== Research history ==
Excavation of the Palazzo delle Colonne began in 1937 under Enrico Paribeni and was continued from 1939 by Gennaro Pesce until the project was halted in 1942 by the Second World War. The conflict severely disrupted documentation: vandals broke into the museum, destroying finds as well as the excavators' notebooks. As a result, Pesce's final monograph had to rely on photographs and his own recollections.

== See also ==
- Hasmonean and Herodian royal winter palaces
- Horvat Eleq
- Khirbet el-Muraq

== Bibliography ==
=== Sources ===
- Bacchielli, Lidiano (1995). "A Cyrenaica earthquake post 364 A.D.: written sources and archaeological evidences". Annali di Geofisica. 38: 979–982.
- McDonald, William A. (1952). "Review of Il "Palazzo delle Colonne" in Tolemaide di Cirenaica, by Gennaro Pesce". American Journal of Archaeology. 56 (1): 100–102. doi:10.2307/500858. JSTOR 500858.
- Ward-Perkins, J. B.; Little, J. H.; Mattingly, D. J.; Gibson, S. C. (1986). "Town Houses at Ptolemais, Cyrenaica: A Summary Report of Survey and Excavation Work in 1971, 1978–1979". Libyan Studies. 17: 109–153. doi:10.1017/S0263718900007093.
