= Al-Athrun =

Athrun الأثرون Lathrun
- Town
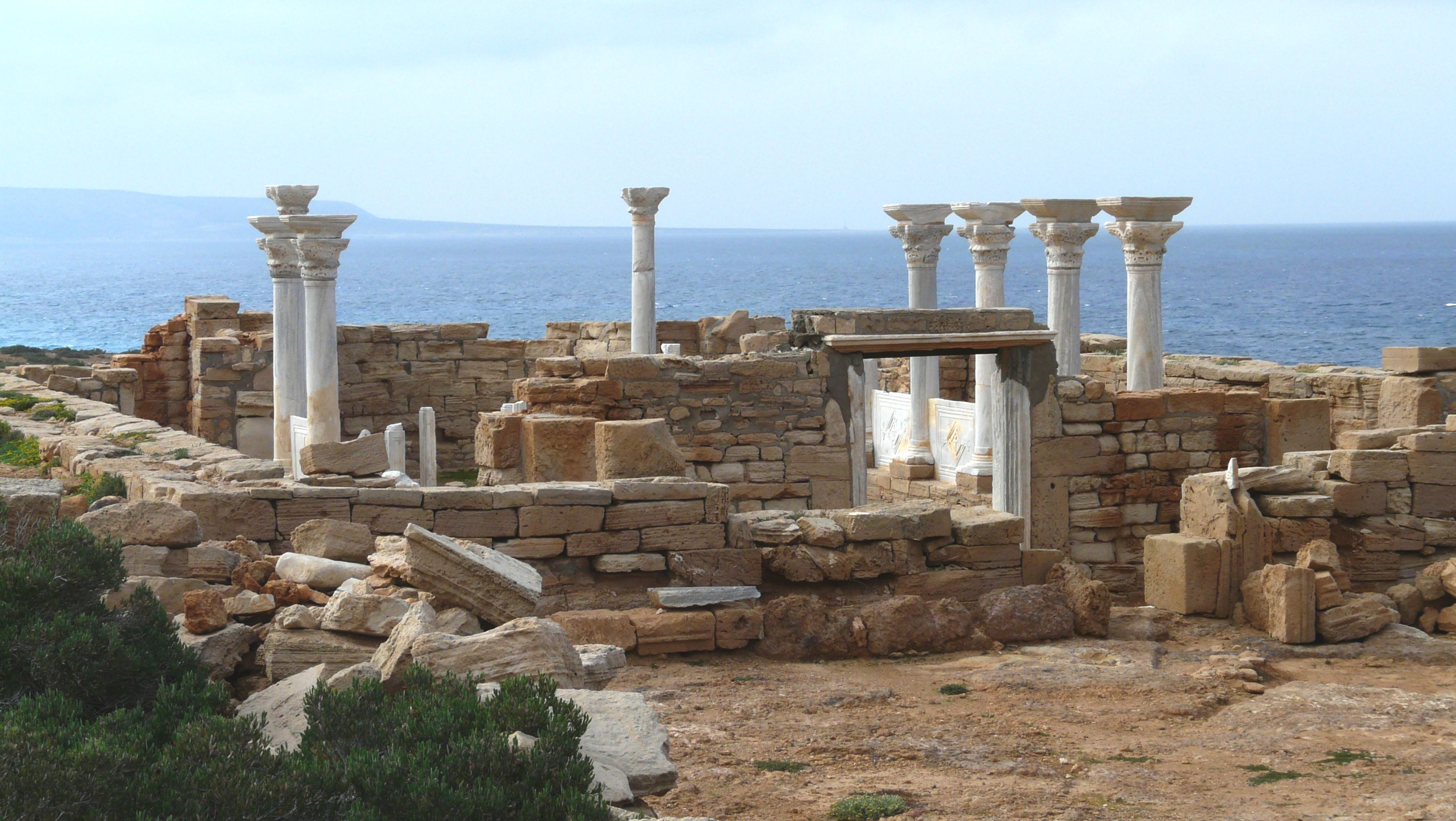
- Byzantine Church in Athrun
- Nickname: Erythron
- Location in Libya
- Coordinates: 32°52′N 22°16′E
- Country: Libya
- Region: Cyrenaica
- District: Derna
- Time zone: UTC+2 (EET)

Al-Athrun (Arabic: الأثرون), also known as Lathrun or Lathron (Arabic: لاثرون) is a small coastal town in north eastern Libya, in the Derna district.

It hosts recently excavated Byzantine churches adorned with white-blue marble from Proconnesus.

== Location ==
Al-Athrun is a small Libyan town located at 32°52′N 22°16′ about 9 km east of Ras al-Hilal and about 50 km east of al-Baidah in al-Jabal al-Akhdar in northeastern Libya and near Derna. Erythron is close to the sea, about 20 kilometers east of Apollonia.

== Name ==
Its name comes from Greek "Ἐρυθρόν" (Erythron), neuter of "ἐρυθρός" (erythros) "red", due to the color of the local soil.

== History ==
It is uncertain when the city was founded, but there are no clear finds from pre-Roman times. There are also no pre-Roman records of the place. However, it has some of the remains of the Greek period, including a group of tombs carved in rock dating back to the 5th century BC.

During the Roman Empire and into late Antiquity the town was known as Erythron and was mentioned by various ancient authors including Claudius Ptolemy.

Especially in Byzantine times, the city flourished, and it was at this time only that it could be described as a city. Several bishops are known and two richly equipped churches can be excavated.

The two churches were built during the reign of Emperor Justinian I (527–565). These are called the Western and Eastern Churches. The remains of the two churches were discovered in 1960 by the American scholar "Waltroding" to be included in the Libyan Antiquities list in 1964 by the Libyan Antiquities Authority.

The Eastern Church is located on the Mediterranean coast, where there are parts of marble columns decorated with Christian religious signs, the remains of the marble floor and the remains of mosaics that surrounded it, while the Western Church left only ruins of the original plan.

Cyrenaica was conquered by Muslim Arabs during the second caliph, Omer Bin Khattab, in 643/44. After the breakdown of the Umayyad Caliphate it was essentially annexed to Egypt, although still under the same name, first under the Fatimid caliphs and later under the Ayyubid and Mamluk sultanates. Ultimately, it was annexed by the Turkish Ottoman Empire in 1517 when it was part of the Tripolitania Vilayet.
