= 365 Crete earthquake =

Eastern Mediterranean natural disaster

- Local date: 21 July 365
- Local time: Sunrise
- Magnitude: M_{w} 8.5+
- Epicenter: near Crete; 35.0°N 23.0°E
- Fault: Unknown (HSZ)
- Areas affected: Mediterranean Basin
- Max. intensity: MMI XI (Extreme)
- Tsunami: Yes
- Casualties: "Many thousands"

The 365 Crete earthquake occurred at about sunrise on 21 July 365 in the Eastern Mediterranean, with an assumed epicentre near Crete. Geologists today estimate the undersea earthquake to have been a moment magnitude 8.5 or higher. It caused widespread destruction in the central and southern Diocese of Macedonia (modern Greece), Africa Proconsularis (northern Libya), Egypt, Cyprus, Sicily, and Hispania (Spain). On Crete, nearly all towns were destroyed.

The earthquake was followed by a tsunami which devastated the southern and eastern coasts of the Mediterranean, particularly Libya, Alexandria, and the Nile Delta, killing thousands and hurling ships 3 km (1.9 mi) inland. The quake left a deep impression on the late antique mind, and numerous writers of the time referred to the event in their works.

== Geological evidence ==
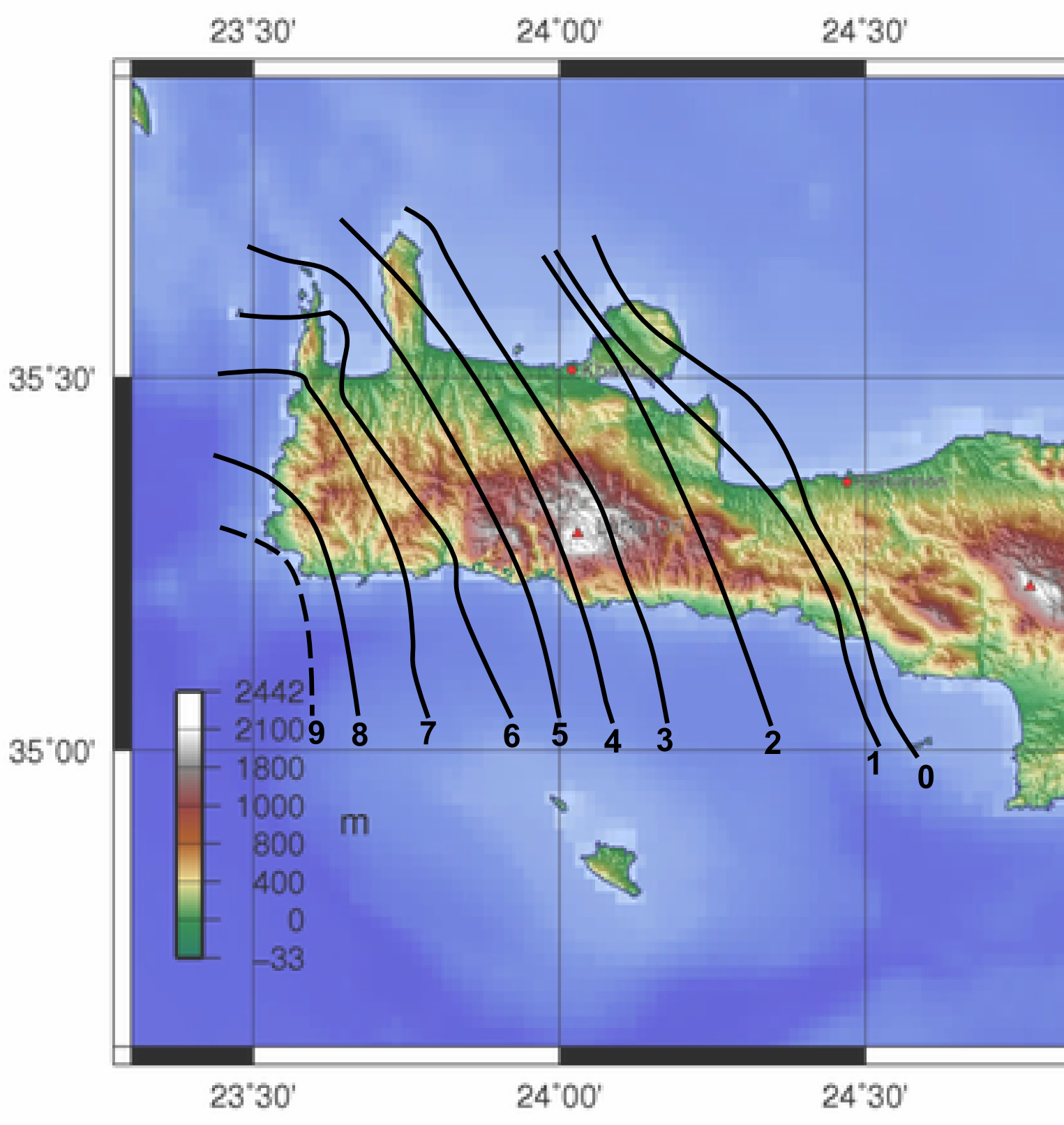
Uplift contours (metres) associated with the 365 earthquake in western Crete after Flemming 1978

Recent (2001) geological studies view the 365 Crete earthquake in connection with a clustering of major seismic activity in the Eastern Mediterranean between the fourth and sixth centuries which may have reflected a reactivation of all major plate boundaries in the region. The earthquake is thought to be responsible for an uplift of nine metres (30 feet) of the island of Crete, which is estimated to correspond to a seismic moment of 1×10^{22} N⋅m (7.4×10^{21} lbf⋅ft), or 8.6 on the moment magnitude scale. An earthquake of such a magnitude exceeds all modern ones known to have affected the region.

Carbon dating shows that corals on the coast of Crete were lifted ten metres (33 feet) and clear of the water in one massive push. This indicates that the tsunami of 365 was generated by an earthquake in a steep fault in the Hellenic Trench near Crete. Scientists estimate that such a large uplift is likely to occur only once in 5,000 years; however, the other segments of the fault could slip on a similar scale—and this could happen every 800 years or so. It is uncertain whether "one of the contiguous patches might slip in the future."

Sedimentation increased dramatically in some areas of the Mediterranean Sea, while other areas had coastal sediments moved to deep waters.

== Literary evidence ==
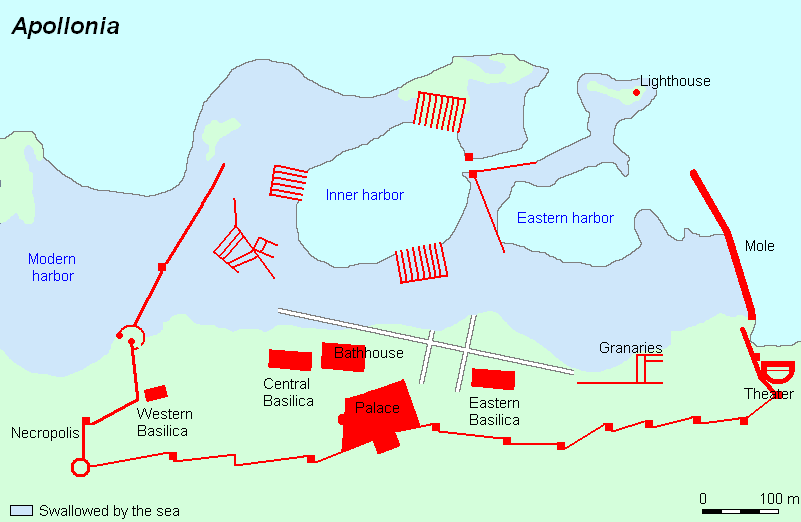
Large parts of Apollonia, in modern-day Libya, were submerged

Historians continue to debate whether ancient sources refer to a single catastrophic earthquake in 365, or whether they represent a historical amalgamation of a number of earthquakes occurring between 350 and 450. The interpretation of the surviving literary evidence is complicated by the tendency of late antique writers to describe natural disasters as divine responses or warnings to political and religious events. In particular, the virulent antagonism between rising Christianity and paganism at the time led contemporary writers to distort the evidence. Thus, the Sophist Libanius and the church historian Sozomenus appear to conflate the great earthquake of 365 with other lesser ones to present it as either divine sorrow or wrath—depending on their viewpoint—for the death of Emperor Julian, who had tried to restore the pagan religion two years earlier.

On the whole, however, the relatively numerous references to earthquakes in a time which is otherwise characterized by a paucity of historical records strengthens the case for a period of heightened seismic activity. Kourion on Cyprus, for example, is known to have been hit then by five strong earthquakes within a period of eighty years, leading to its permanent destruction.

== Archaeology ==
Archaeological evidence for the particularly devastating effect of the 365 earthquake is provided by a survey of excavations which document the destruction of most late antique towns and cities in the Eastern and Southern Mediterranean around 365.

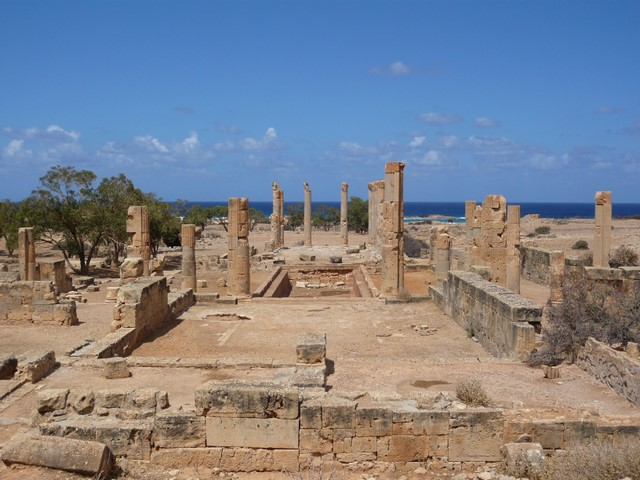
Ruins of the Palazzo delle Colonne at Ptolemais, Libya, where column collapse and human remains found in the peristyle pool attest to sudden destruction caused by the earthquake

In Cyrenaica (northwestern Libya), two coin hoards attest to the destruction: one from Balagrae, recovered beneath the ambulacrum of the Sanctuary Theater of Asclepius, and another from Cyrene, found beneath a late-antique domestic structure south of the Lower Agora. Both hoards consist predominantly of small bronze coins minted between 350 and 361, with the latest identifiable coin dating to 364. Architectural remains across this region also display earthquake damage. At Cyrene, excavations in the Agora, the North Stoa, the House of Jason Magnus, the Baths of Trajan, and the Temple of Apollo, all uncovered fallen colonnades with column drums displaced sequentially, overturned blocks, and walls collapsed inward, patterns compatible with violent ground motion rather than gradual decay. In several cases, human skeletal remains were discovered crushed beneath fallen masonry, confirming the sudden and lethal nature of the event. Comparable destruction is documented at Ptolemais, where collapsed columns along the Via Monumentale and within the palace complex were never fully restored, despite later imperial rebuilding initiatives. The remains of inhabitants attempting to flee were discovered in the peristyle pool of the city's Palazzo delle Colonne.

There is also epigraphic evidence that helps corroborate the structural damage. In the necropolis north of Cyrene, a funerary inscription commemorating a woman named Demetria and her son Theodoulos explicitly records their deaths as caused by an earthquake. Paleographically, the inscription can be dated to the second half of the 4th century.

== Tsunami ==
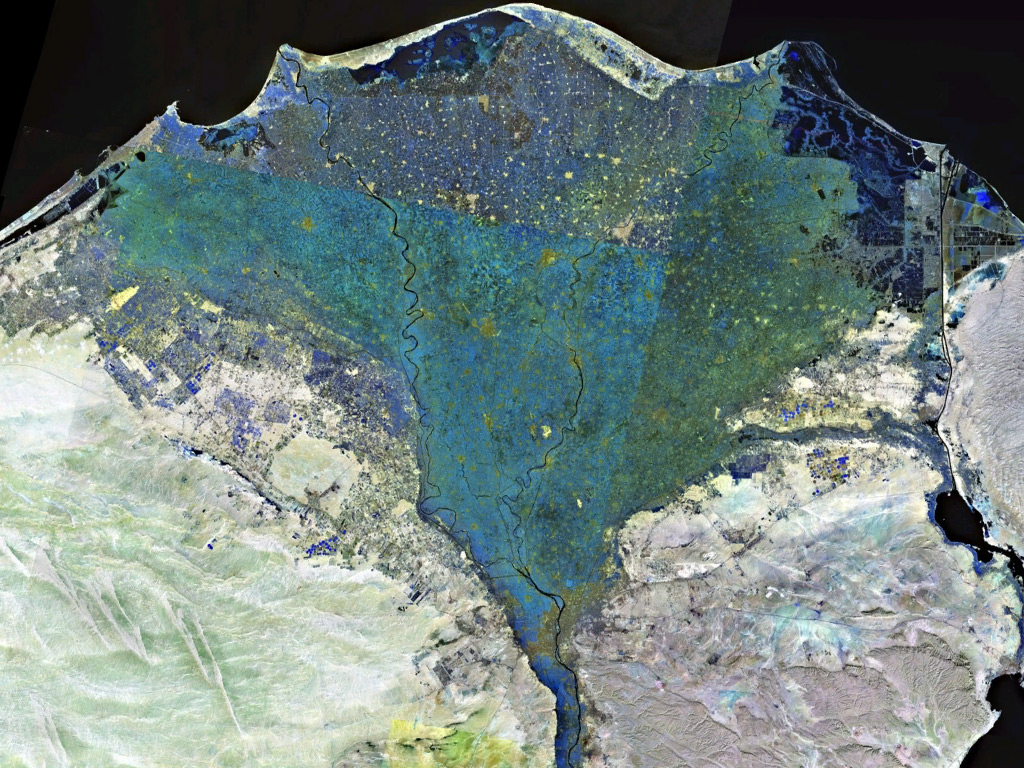
Nile Delta

The Roman historian Ammianus Marcellinus described in detail the tsunami that hit Alexandria and other places in the early hours of 21 July 365. His account is particularly noteworthy for clearly distinguishing the three main phases of a tsunami, namely an initial earthquake, the sudden retreat of the sea and an ensuing gigantic wave rolling inland:

Slightly after daybreak, and heralded by a thick succession of fiercely shaken thunderbolts, the solidity of the whole earth was made to shake and shudder, and the sea was driven away, its waves were rolled back, and it disappeared, so that the abyss of the depths was uncovered and many-shaped varieties of sea-creatures were seen stuck in the slime; the great wastes of those valleys and mountains, which the very creation had dismissed beneath the vast whirlpools, at that moment, as it was given to be believed, looked up at the sun's rays. Many ships, then, were stranded as if on dry land, and people wandered at will about the paltry remains of the waters to collect fish and the like in their hands; then the roaring sea as if insulted by its repulse rises back in turn, and through the teeming shoals dashed itself violently on islands and extensive tracts of the mainland, and flattened innumerable buildings in towns or wherever they were found. Thus in the raging conflict of the elements, the face of the earth was changed to reveal wondrous sights. For the mass of waters returning when least expected killed many thousands by drowning, and with the tides whipped up to a height as they rushed back, some ships, after the anger of the watery element had grown old, were seen to have sunk, and the bodies of people killed in shipwrecks lay there, faces up or down. Other huge ships, thrust out by the mad blasts, perched on the roofs of houses, as happened at Alexandria, and others were hurled nearly two miles from the shore, like the Laconian vessel near the town of Methone which I saw when I passed by, yawning apart from long decay.

The tsunami in 365 was so devastating that the anniversary of the disaster was still commemorated annually at the end of the sixth century in Alexandria as a "day of horror".

According to the Life of Hilarion, a hagiography, the eponymous saint saved the town of Epidauros in the Adriatic Sea from the waves of the tsunami by raising his hands in the sign of the cross; this has been often taken uncritically as evidence that the tsunami also affected the Adriatic, though there is little evidence for that.

== Gallery ==
Effects of the earthquake visible in the ancient remains:

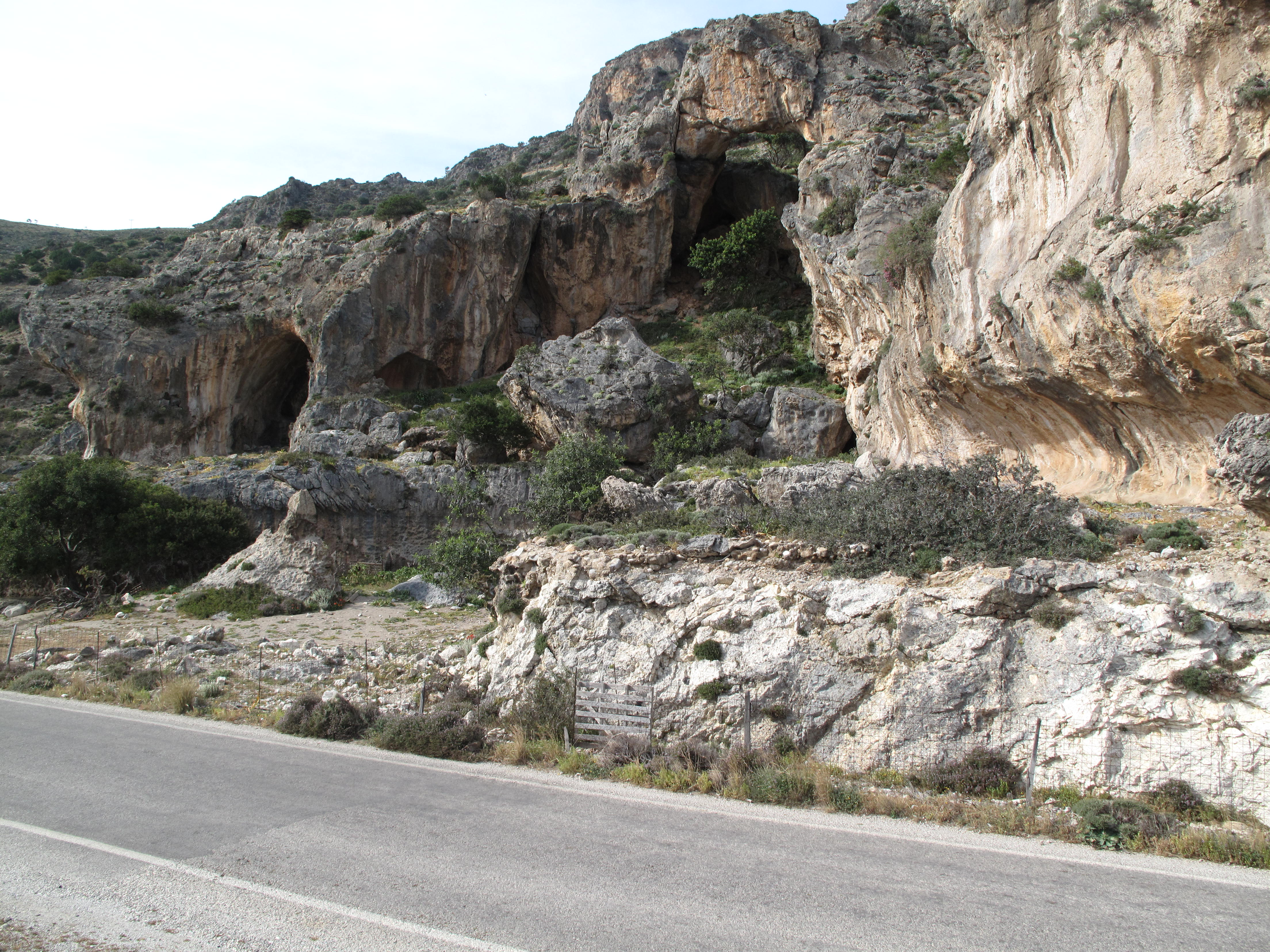
Raised beach 2 km west of Paleochora (Crete) showing wave-cut notch and sea caves uplifted by about 9 m during the earthquake

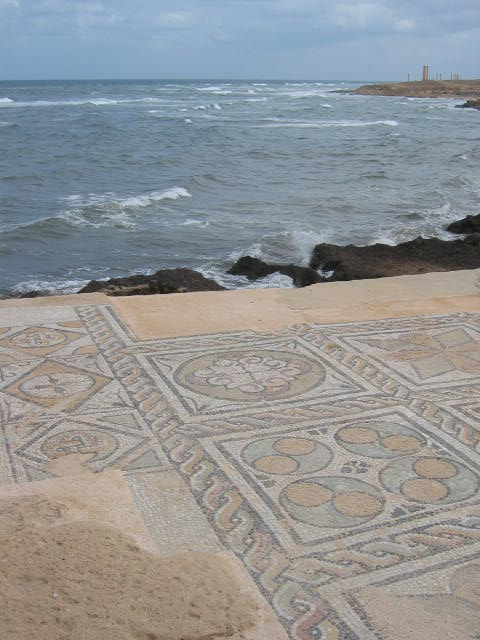
Sea advanced close to the baths at Sabratha (Libya)

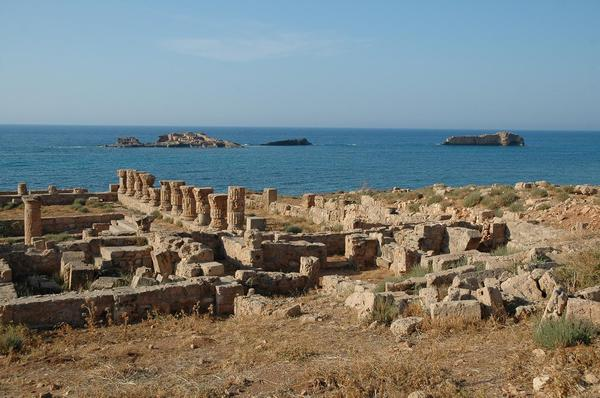
Submerged harbors at Apollonia (Libya)

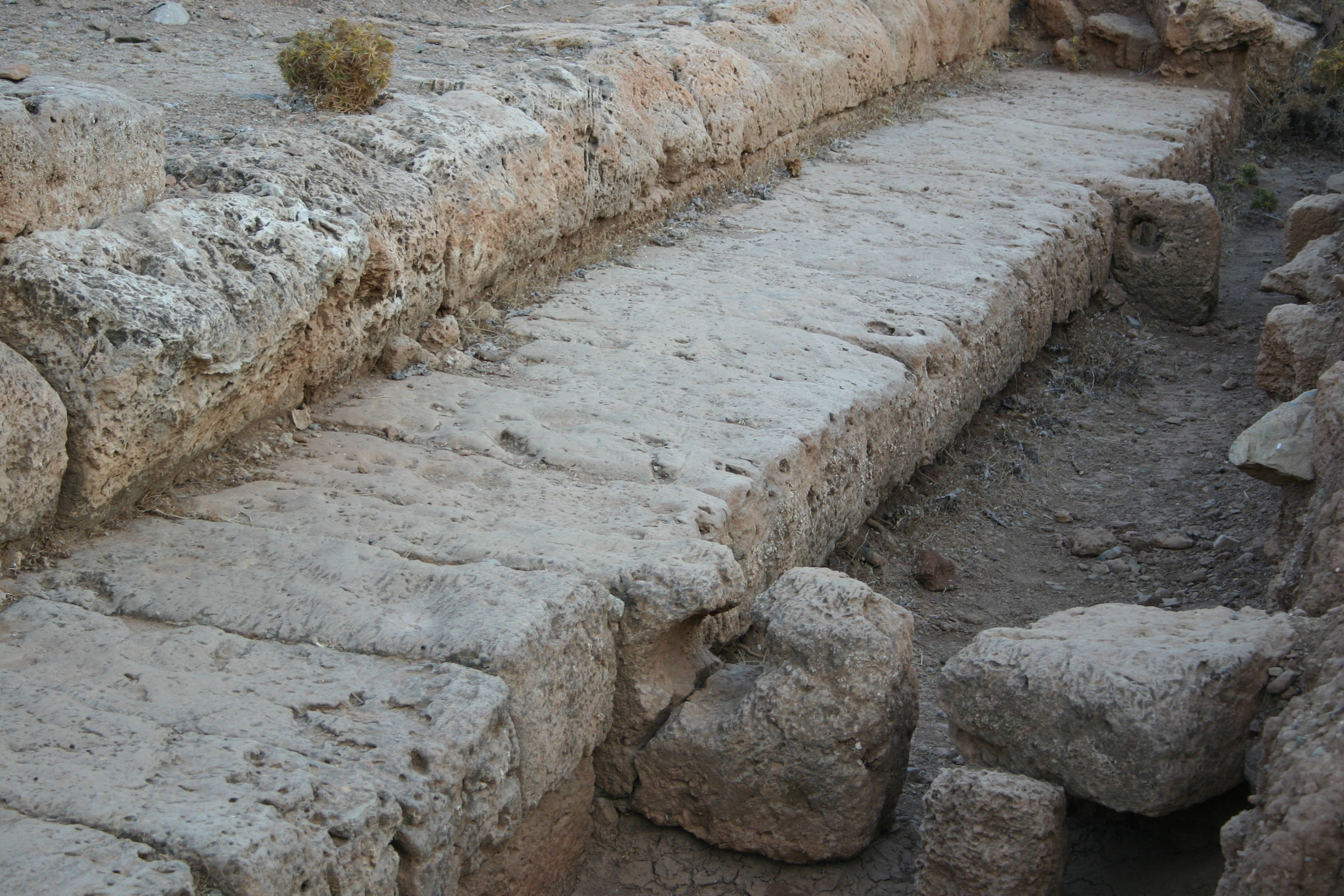
The no-longer-submerged harbor in Phalasarna (Crete)

== See also ==
- 426 BC Malian Gulf tsunami
- List of earthquakes in Greece
- List of historical earthquakes
- List of tsunamis
