= Treasury of Cyrene =

- Interactive map of Treasury of Cyrene
- Location: Delphi, Cyrene, Libya
- Type: treasury
- Completion date: ca. 334–322 B.C.

The Treasury of Cyrene (Treasury of the Cyreneans) was a building in the sanctuary of Apollo in Delphi. The treasury was possibly built as a token of gratitude for a large endowment of wheat offered to Delphi's inhabitants during a lean period.

== Description ==
The Treasury of Cyrene was probably the last treasury to have been built within the sanctuary of Apollo. It was oriented towards the Temple of Apollo. Its date of construction is estimated at ca. 334–322 BC. It was constructed at the eastern part of the precinct, supported by a base (crepis) made of limestone and consisting of three steps. The elevation of the treasury was made of two kinds of marble with provenance from Paros and Mount Pentelikon. It was built in the Doric order, distyle in antis, with a vestibule and a cella. The antae were provided with semi-columns on their interior side. The building was covered by a marble roof, the sima of which was decorated with gargoyles in alternating forms (lion heads and simple tubes). An inscription on the north anta mentions that the Cyreneans were accorded the promanteia by the city of Delphi, as a sign of gratitude for a heavy load of wheat that the former offered the latter during a period of famine. Cyrene was a wheat-producing region throughout the Hellenistic and Roman periods. In front of the treasury there was a small square and to its south was discovered a building which was formerly identified as the prytaneion.

== See also ==
- Apollonia Museum

== Bibliography ==
- Bommelaer, J.-F., (1991), Laroche, D., Guide de Delphes, Le site, Paris, pp. 156–157
- Bousquet, J., 1952, Le trésor de Cyrène. FD, II, Topographie et architecture, Paris
- Laroche, D., 1988, L'emplacement du trésor de Cyrène a Delphes, BCH 112.1, 1988, 291–305
