= André Laronde =

French historian and archaeologist of Ancient Greece

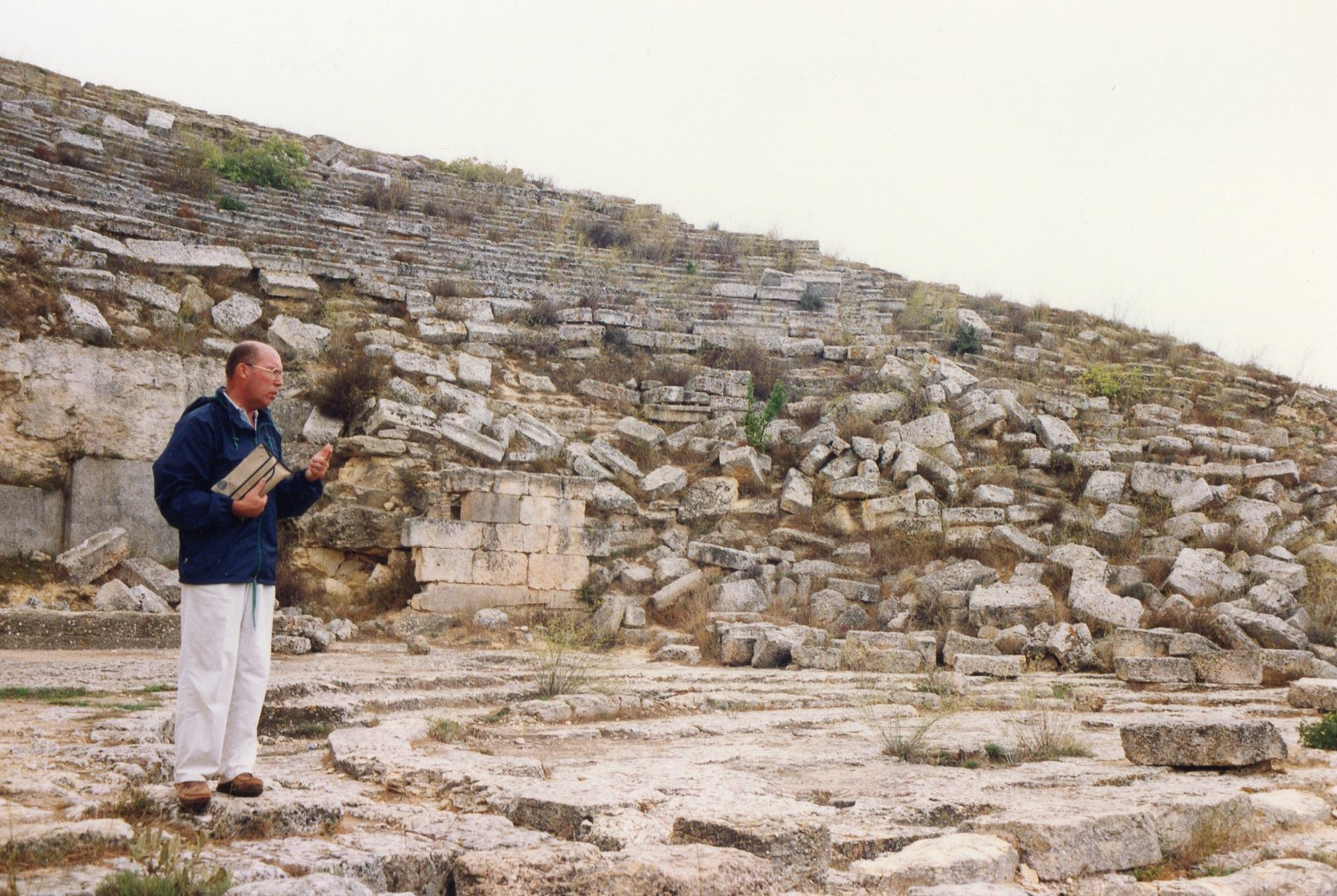
André Laronde in Cyrene, 1973

André Laronde (19 June 1940, in Grenoble – 1 February 2011, in Paris) was a French historian and archaeologist. He was a specialist of Greek settlements in Cyrenaica (now Libya).

== Career ==
Laronde wrote his PhD thesis under the directorship of François Chamoux. After he taught at the University of Grenoble, André Laronde was a professor at the Sorbonne in which he presented in 1976 his thesis for the State doctorate « Recherche sur l'histoire de Cyrène », which studied the history of Cyrenaica under the domination of the Lagides.

He assisted François Chamoux since the creation in 1976 of the French Archaeological Mission in Tripoli, then became director from 1981. He also conducted the excavations in Cyrene and Apollonia, Cyrenaica.

He was elected a member of the Académie des Inscriptions et Belles-Lettres in 2002.

He died of a heart attack on 1 February 2011 at the age of 70.

== Selected works ==
- 1971: Nouveau choix d'inscriptions grecques (collective).
- 1982: Mémoire d'Allevard (direction)
- 1985: Apollonia de Cyrénaïque et son histoire. Neuf ans de recherches de la mission archéologique française en Libye, CRAI, 129, n° 1, (p. 93–116)
- 1987: Cyrène et la Libye hellénistique. Libykai Historiai. De l'époque républicaine au principat d'Auguste.
- 1988: La Cyrénaïque romaine, des origines à la fin des Sévères (96 av. J.-C.- 235 ap. J.-C.) (in Aufstieg und Niedergang der römischen Welt II, 10, 1).
- 1990: (in Italian) Ricerche archeologiche nei porti della Libia, Apollonia e Leptis Magna.
- 1994: Nouvelles recherches archéologiques dans le port de Lepcis Magna, CRAI, 138, n° 4, (p. 991–1006)
- 1996: La civilisation hellénistique.
- 1996: La Libye à travers les cartes postales, 1900–1940.
- 1996: Apollonia de Cyrénaïque : archéologie et histoire (in Journal des Savants).
- 1996: L'exploitation de la chôra cyrénéenne à l'époque classique et hellénistique, CRAI, 140, n° 2, (p. 503–527)
- 2000: Précis d'histoire ancienne
- 2000: La Libye.
- 2001: L'Afrique antique, histoire et monuments (in coll. with Jean-Claude Golvin), Paris.
- 2001: Un nouveau portrait de Ptolémée III à Apollonia de Cyrénaïque, CRAI, 145, n° 2, (p. 737–782)
