= Apollonia (Cyrenaica) =

Ancient Cyrenaican town

- Ἀπολλωνία (Greek)
- Sozusa
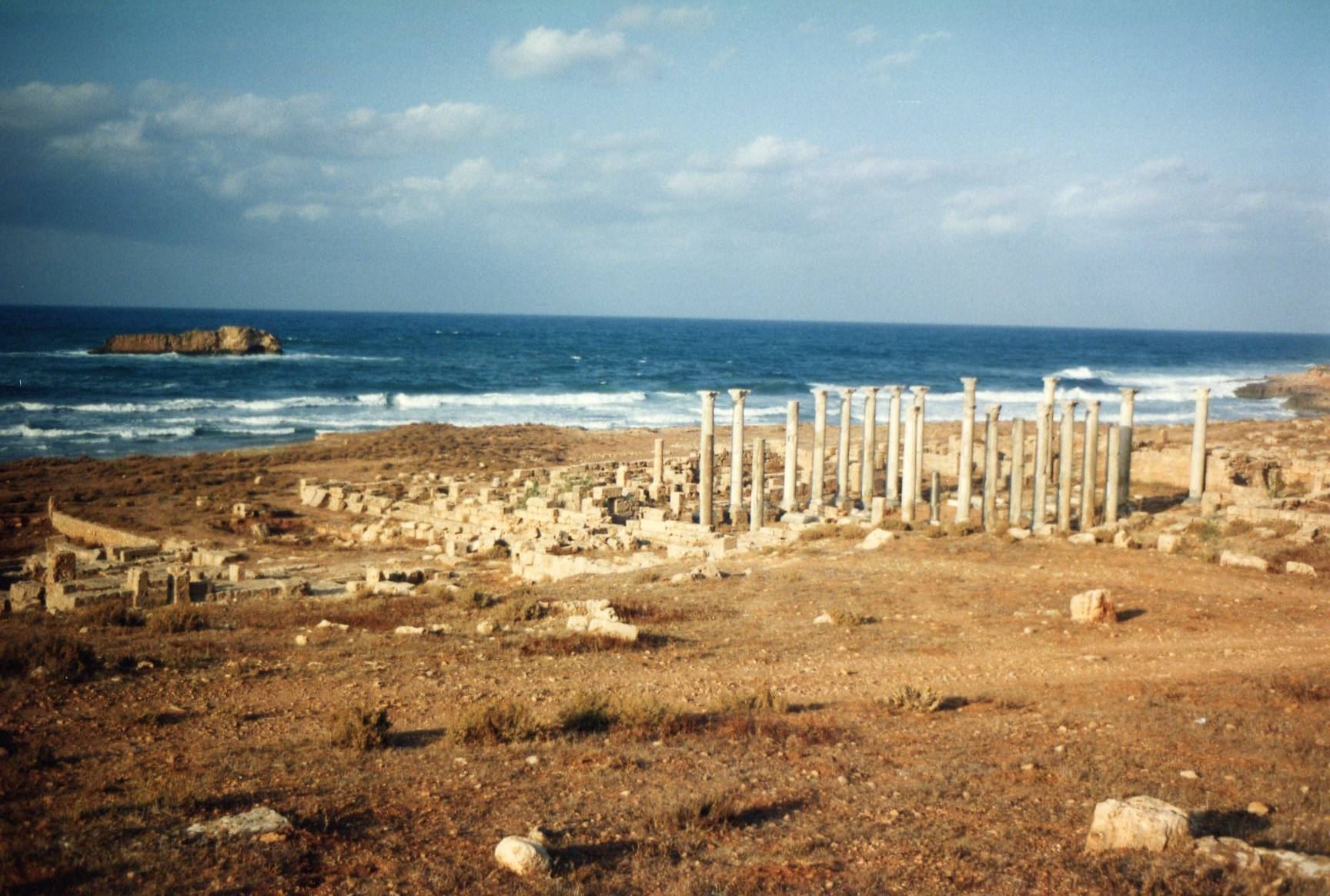
- Eastern port of Apollonia

- Location within Libya
- 32°54′07″N 21°58′11″E
- Type: Settlement
- Location: Marsa Susa, Jabal al Akhdar, Libya

History
- Built: 7th century BC
- Abandoned: 7th century AD

Site notes
- Public access: yes

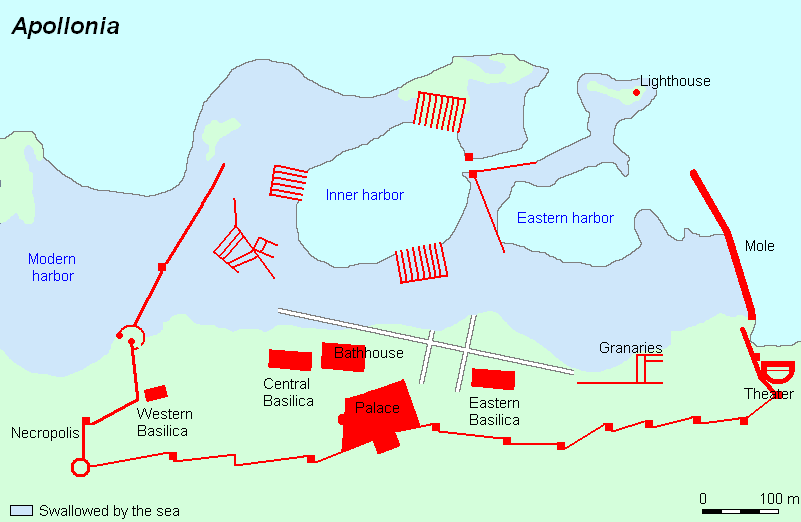
Map of Apollonia

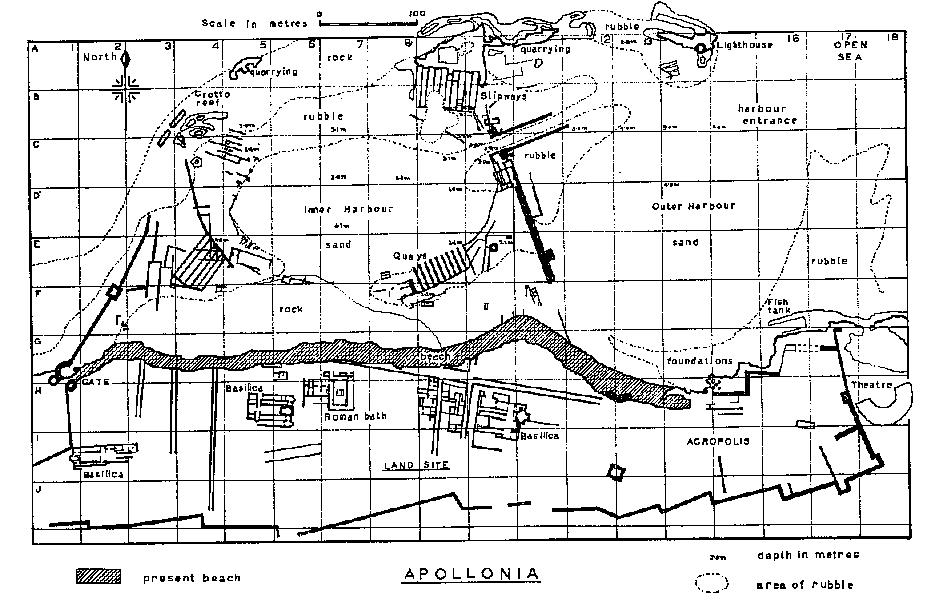
Map of underwater ruins at Apollonia made by divers in 1958–1959

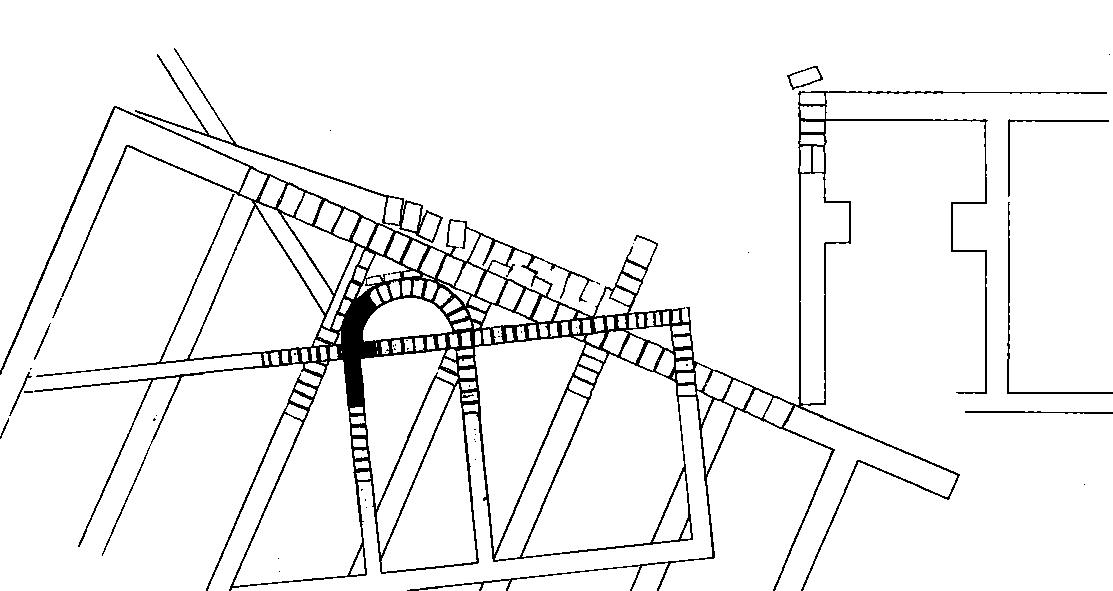
Late apsidal building at Apollonia superimposed on earlier structures (grid square C4) drawn by divers in 1958–1959

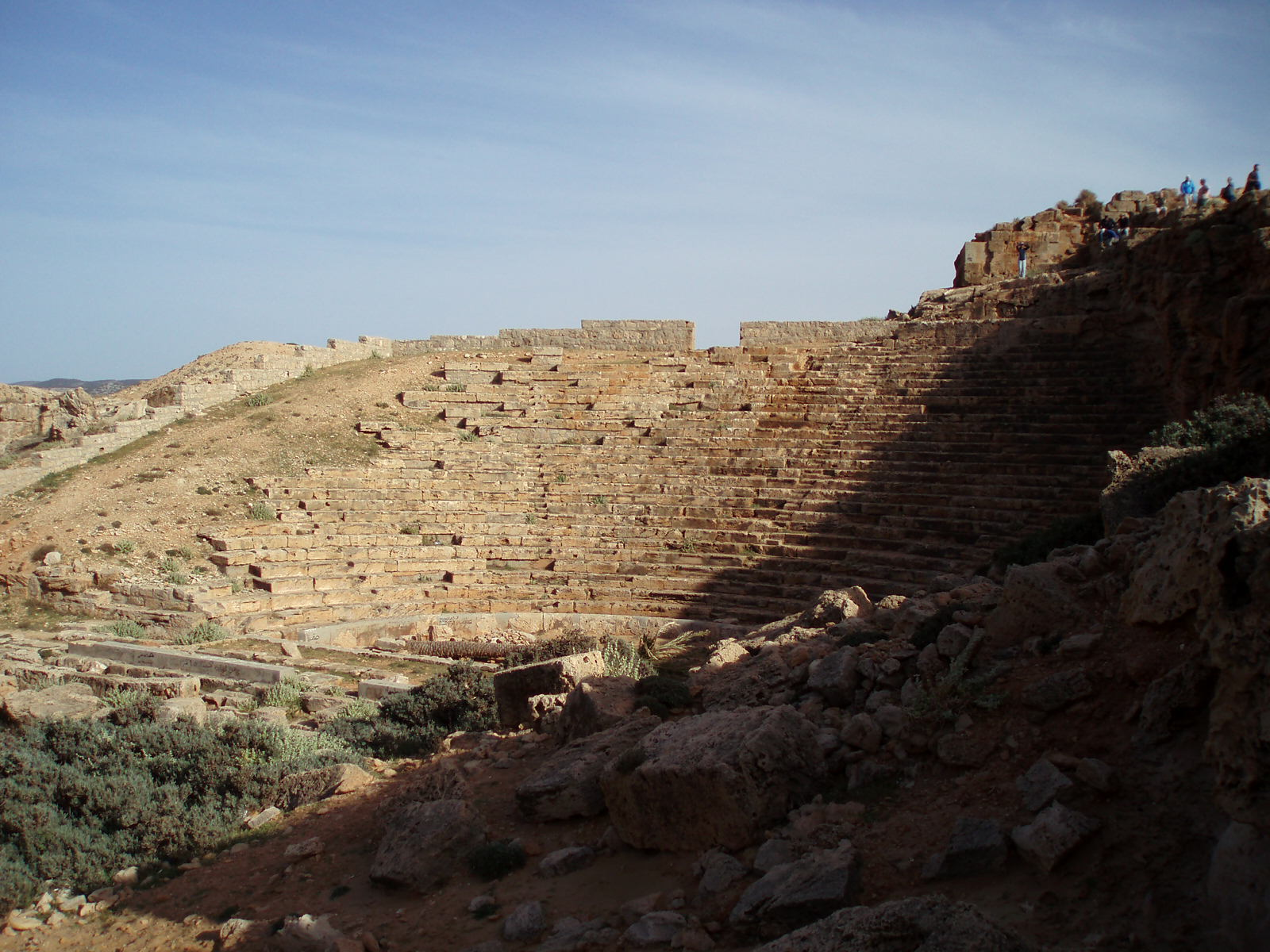
Theatre in Apollonia

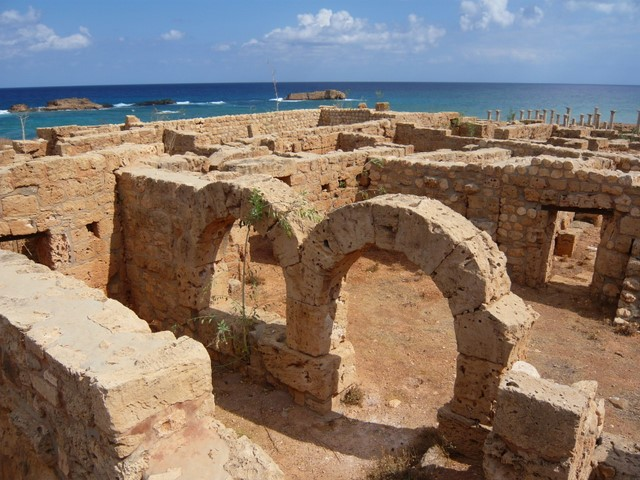
Palace in Apollonia with the Eastern Basilica in the background

Apollonia (Greek: Ἀπολλωνία) in Cyrenaica (modern Libya) was founded by Greek colonists and became a significant commercial centre in the southern Mediterranean. It served as the harbour of Cyrene, 20 km (12 mi) to the southwest.

Apollonia became autonomous from Cyrene at latest by the time the area came within the power of Rome, when it was one of the five cities of the Libyan Pentapolis, growing in power until, in the 6th century AD, it became the capital of the Roman province of Libya Superior or Libya Pentapolitana. The city became known as Sozusa, which explains the modern name of Marsa Susa or Susa, which grew up long after the cessation of urban life in the ancient city after the Arab occupation of AD 643.

Sozusa was an episcopal see and is included in the Catholic Church's list of titular sees.

== Ruins ==
The early foundation levels of the city of Apollonia are below sea level due to submergence in earthquakes, while the upper strata of the later Byzantine Christian periods are several meters above sea level, built on the accumulated deposits of previous periods. The existence of buildings in the sea was noted by Beechey (1827), with some rough drawings, and Goodchild (1950s) and André Laronde also published archaeological surveys of the site. In 1958 and 1959 Nicholas Flemming, then an undergraduate at Cambridge University, led teams of undergraduates trained in scuba diving and underwater surveying to map the large sector of the city beneath the sea. The results of this work were published, complete with maps and diagrams of underwater buildings in the references cited below. Carlo Beltrame and colleagues have recently made an underwater photographic survey of some of the buildings.

The Crete earthquake and tsunami of 21 July 365 AD apparently caused extensive damage to the city and harbor.

The Apollonia (Susa) Museum houses many artifacts found on the ancient site.

=== The ancient port ===
The remains of the ancient port in Apollonia are extremely well preserved because they are underwater. The difference in sea level, indeed, was estimated to be around 3.70-3.80 m. The port is relatively early in date, dating from the 6th/7th Century BC, and this makes it unique as no other complete port is this old.

=== Palace ===
The Palace of the Dux was excavated by Goodchild between 1959 and 1962. It was last used as the Byzantine Duke's Palace and contains over 100 rooms. A marble inscription testifies to its use as a Roman military commander's house, however the identification of the name and status of the man who built the palace is problematic.

=== Theatre ===
The well-preserved Greek theatre stands facing the sea outside the old city walls. This monument dates to the 3rd century BC and is therefore one of the oldest sites in Apollonia. The structure was modified under Domitian, suggesting its use as an arena for gladiatorial fights. The 5th century saw the abandonment of the theatre and the re-use of the columns from the stage as spolia in the eastern basilica. The cavea has 28 seat levels.

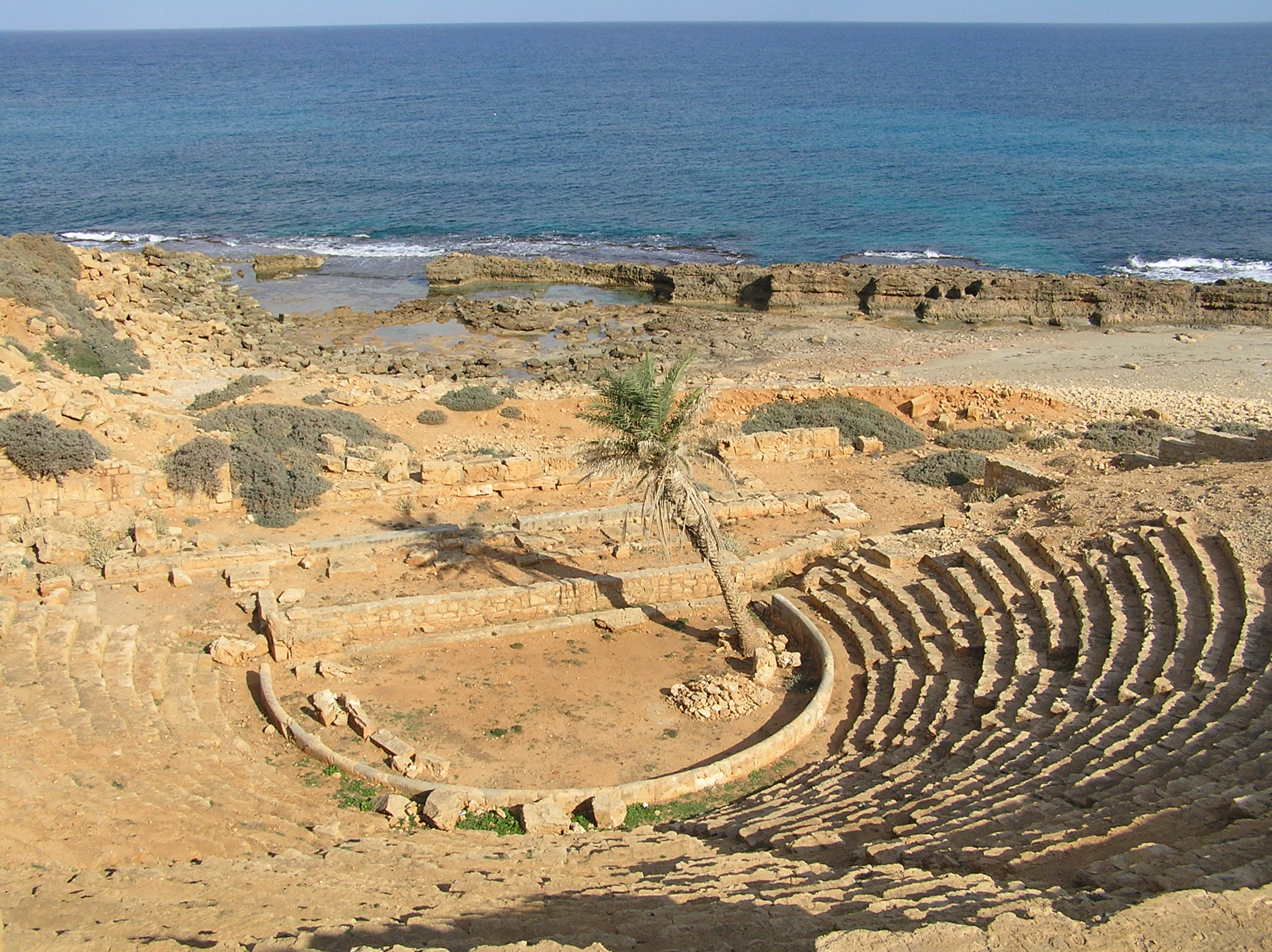
The ancient theatre

== See also ==
- Barca
- Ptolemais, Cyrenaica
- List of ancient Greek cities

== Sources ==
- LookLex
- Beechey, F.W. 1827. Proceedings of an Expedition to Explore the North African coast. John Murray, London.
- Flemming, N.C. 1959. "Underwater adventure in Apollonia". Geographical Magazine, v. 31, pp. 497–508.
- Flemming, N.C. 1971. Cities in the Sea. Doubleday, New York, 222 pp; New English Library, London, 222pp.
- Flemming, N.C. and Webb, C.O, 1986. "Tectonic and eustatic coastal changes during the last 10,000 years derived from archaeological data". Zeitschrift für Geomorphologie. December, Suppl – Bd62, p. 1 29.
- The ancient port of Apollonia is an archaeological treasure to be preserved.
