= Tolmeita =

Tolmeita طلميتة
- Village
- Location in Libya
- Coordinates: 32°42′19.48″N 20°56′41.09″E
- Country: Libya
- Region: Cyrenaica
- District: Marj
- Elevation: 14.7 m (48.2 ft)
- Time zone: UTC+2 (CAT)

Tolmeita, Tolmeta or Tolmeitha Arabic: طلميتة is a village in the northern Cyrenaica region of eastern Libya, some 110 km (68 mi) east of Benghazi, near Ad Dirsiyah. Its name is derived from Greek Πτολεμαΐς (Ptolemais), the name of the classical city of Ptolemais, whose ruins are nearby.

== See also ==
- List of cities in Libya
