= Erythrum =

Erythrum Ἐρυθρόν
- Town
- Location in Libya
- Coordinates: 32°52′N 22°16′E
- Country: Libya
- Region: Cyrenaica
- District: Derna
- Time zone: UTC+2 (EET)

Erythrum was a city and bishopric in Roman Africa, which remains a Catholic titular see.

The city, identified with modern Uaili-Et-Trun, was important enough in the Roman province of (Creta and) Cyrenaica and later the split-off province Libya Superior or Libya Pentapolitana to become a suffragan of its capital's Metropolitan of Cyrene.

Cyrenaica was conquered by Muslim Arabs during the tenure of the second caliph, Omer Bin Khattab, in 643/44, After the breakdown of the Umayyad caliphate it was essentially annexed to Egypt, although still under the same name, first under the Fatimid caliphs and later under the Ayyubid and Mamluk sultanates. Ultimately, it was annexed by the Turkish Ottoman Empire in 1517 when it was part of the Tripolitania Vilayet.

== Christian bishopric ==
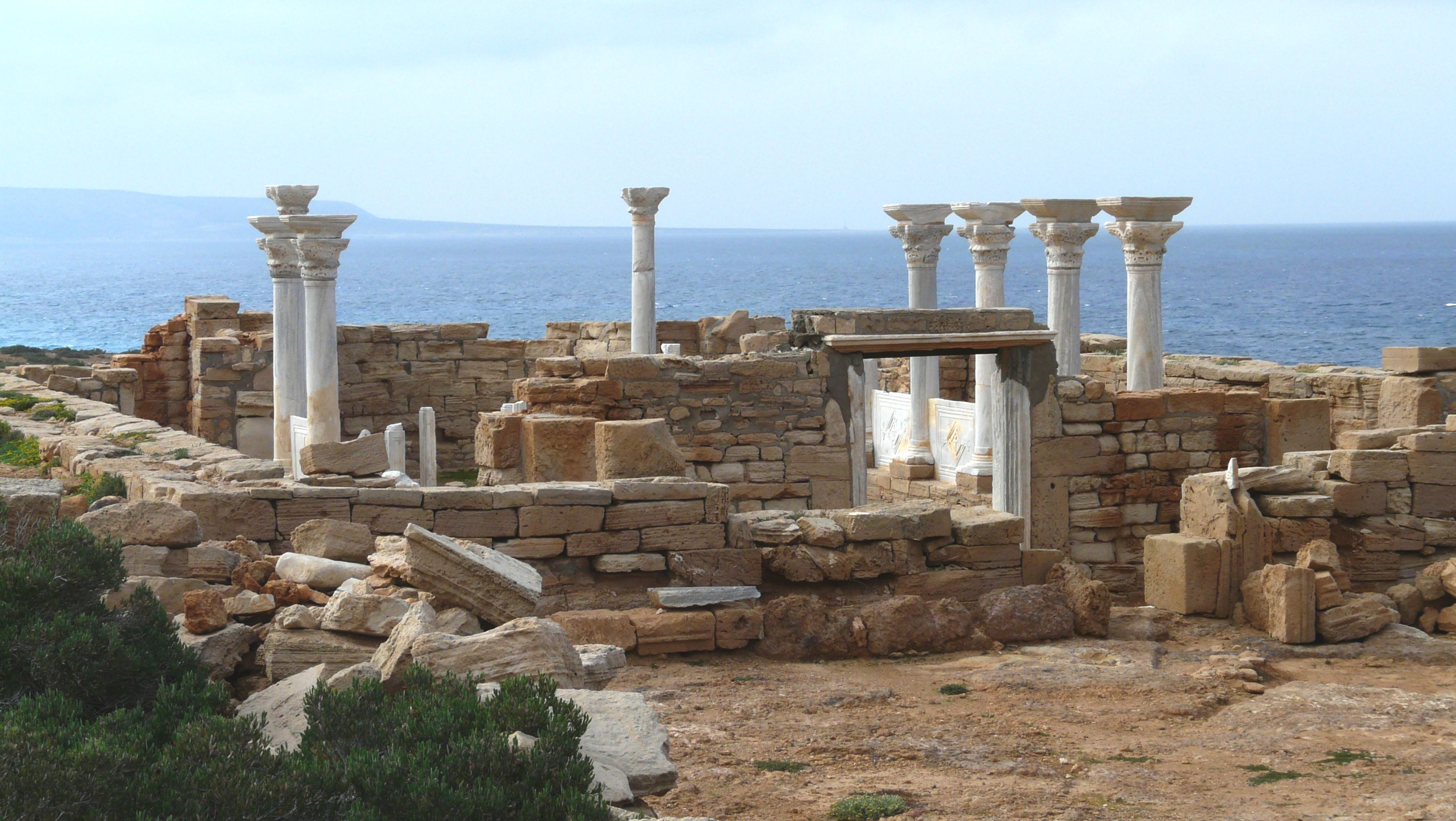
Erythron church

The Diocese of Erythron was a center of Early Christianity in the Pentapolis of North Africa. It was an early Christian bishopric. The seat of the Diocese was the Roman town of Erython, tentatively identified with the village of Uaili-Et-Trun in today's Libya. We know of four bishops of the diocese from antiquity.

- Orione (2nd century)
- Sabbazio
- Paolo
- Theophilo (fl.451)

The diocese was nominally restored in 1933 as Latin titular bishopric under the names of Erythrum (Latine) / Eritro (Curiate Italian) / Erythritan(us) (Latin adjective)., It has been vacant for decades, having had the following incumbents, so far of the fitting Episcopal (lowest) rank, including an Eastern Catholic :

- Antonio Cavaleri (1764.04.09 – 1788.09.15) as Auxiliary Bishop of Agrigento (Sicily, insular Italy) (1764.04.09 – 1788.09.15); succeeded as Bishop of Agrigento (1788.09.15 – death 1792.12.11)
- Raimondo A. Vecchietti (1797.07.24 – 1801.01.26) without prelature, later Bishop of Colle di Val d'Elsa (Italy) (1801.01.26 – death 1805.02)
- Michele de Vincenti (1817.04.14 – death 1827), without prelature
- Giovanni Battista Rosani, Piarists (Sch. P.) (born Italy) (1844.01.22 – death 1862.08.08) as President of Pontifical Ecclesiastical Academy (1844.01.22 – 1847) and on emeritate
- Giovanni Felix Jacovacci (1863.10.01 – 1879.06.10) (born Italy), no prelature
- Victor van den Branden de Reeth) (1879.11.14 – 1897.12.04) as Auxiliary Bishop of Mechelen (Belgium) (1879.11.14 – 1909.02.27); later on emeritate 'promoted' as Titular Archbishop of Tyrus (Tyre) (1897.12.04 – death 1909.02.27)
- Ghebre Jesus Jacob (1951.02.24 – death 1969.01.22) as Apostolic Exarch of Asmara of the Eritreans (Eastern Catholic in Eritrea) (1951.02.24 – 1958.02.03) and on emeritate.

== See also ==
- Athrun, Libya

== Sources and external links ==
- GCatholic - data for all sections
