= Apollonia Museum =

Apollonia Museum (Susa Museum)
- Location: Susa, Libya
- Type: Archaeological museum

Apollonia Museum (also known as the Susa Museum) is an archaeological museum located in Susa, Libya. Its collection includes Ancient Libyan and Ptolemaic sculptures, funerary art, architectural elements, ceramics, and other household items. The museum houses primarily Greek and Latin artifacts.

== History ==
As a harbor for the city of Cyrene, Apollonia was created in the seventh century. The Greek sun god Apollo is the source of the name Apollonia. The Apollonia Museum is home to a large collection of sculptures, busts, heads, columns, ceramics, and other domestic artifacts.

== See also ==
- List of museums in Libya
- Treasury of Cyrene
