= Susa, Libya =

Susa سوسة
- Town
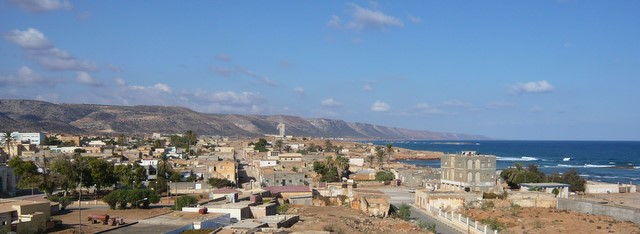

- Location in Libya
- Coordinates: 32°53′48″N 21°57′47″E
- Country: Libya
- District: Jabal al Akhdar

Population (2012)
  - Total: 7,999
- Time zone: UTC + 2

Susa or Soussa (/ˈsuːsə/ SOO-sə; Arabic: سوسة, romanized: Sūsa; Ancient Greek: Ἀπολλωνία, romanized: Apollōnía) is a town and seaside resort in the District of Jabal al Akhdar in north-eastern Libya. Susa stands by the ruins of Apollonia, Cyrenaica. The town contains the Apollonia Museum. It is located about 30 km northeast of Bayda.

== History ==
The ancient city of Apollonia in Cyrenaica was founded in 630 BC by Greek colonists and became a significant commercial centre in the southern Mediterranean. It served as the harbour of Cyrene, 20 km (12 mi) to the southwest.

Apollonia became autonomous from Cyrene at the latest by the time the area came within the power of Rome, when it was one of the five cities of the Libyan Pentapolis, growing in power until, in the sixth century A.D., it became the capital of the Roman province of Libya Superior or Libya Pentapolitana. The city became known as Sozusa, which explains the modern name of Marsa Susa or Susa, which grew up long after the cessation of urban life in the ancient city after the Arab invasion of AD 643.

Sozusa was an episcopal see and is included in the Catholic Church's list of titular sees.

=== Turkish community ===
Susa is home to a forcibly exiled Turkish community, also referred to as "Turco-Romnoi" ("Turkish Rum" or "Turkish Greeks") from Crete and Mainland Greece, arriving in Ottoman Libya after the Greco-Turkish War of 1897. Another wave of Turkish exiles arrived after the Population exchange between Greece and Turkey, marking the city's second founding after its abandonment following the Arab Conquest of the Maghreb.

== See also ==
- List of cities in Libya
