= Cyrenaica =

Eastern coastal region of Libya

Cyrenaica برقة
- Region
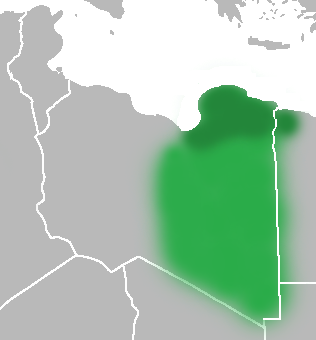
- The traditional region of Cyrenaica (dark green), and the modern expansion (light green)
- Country: Libya
- Capital: Benghazi

Government
  - Type: Kingdom (632–440 BC; 276–249 BC; 163–96 BC; 34–30 BC); Republic (440–322 BC; 249–246 BC); Nome (322–276 BC; 246–96 BC); Roman province (74 BC-643 AD); Vilayet (1879–1888 AD); Mutasarrıf (1888–1911 AD); Italian colony (1911–1943 AD); Military administration (1943–1949 AD); Emirate (643–? AD; 1949–1951 AD); Province (1951–1963 AD)

Cyrenaica (/ˌsaɪrəˈneɪ.ɪkəˌˌsɪr-/ SY-rə-NAY-ik-ə-,-SIRR-ə) or Kyrenaika (Arabic: برقة, romanized: Barqah, Koine Greek: Κυρηναϊκή [ἐπαρχία], romanized: Kūrēnaïkḗ [eparkhíā], after the city of Cyrene), is the eastern region of Libya. Cyrenaica includes all of the eastern part of Libya between the 16th and 25th meridians east, including the Kufra District. The coastal region, also known as Pentapolis ("Five Cities") in antiquity, was part of the Roman province of Crete and Cyrenaica, later divided into Libya Pentapolis and Libya Sicca. During the Islamic period, the area came to be known as Barqa, after the city of Barca.

Cyrenaica became an Italian colony in 1911. After the 1934 formation of Italian Libya, the Cyrenaica province was designated as one of the three primary provinces of the country. During World War II, it fell under British military and civil administration from 1943 until 1951, and finally in the Kingdom of Libya from 1951 until 1963. The region that used to be Cyrenaica officially until 1963 has formed several shabiyat, the administrative divisions of Libya, since 1995. The 2011 Libyan Civil War started in Cyrenaica, which came largely under the control of the National Transitional Council (headquartered in Benghazi) for most of the war. In 2012, a body known as the Cyrenaica Transitional Council unilaterally declared Cyrenaica to be an autonomous region of Libya.

== Geography ==
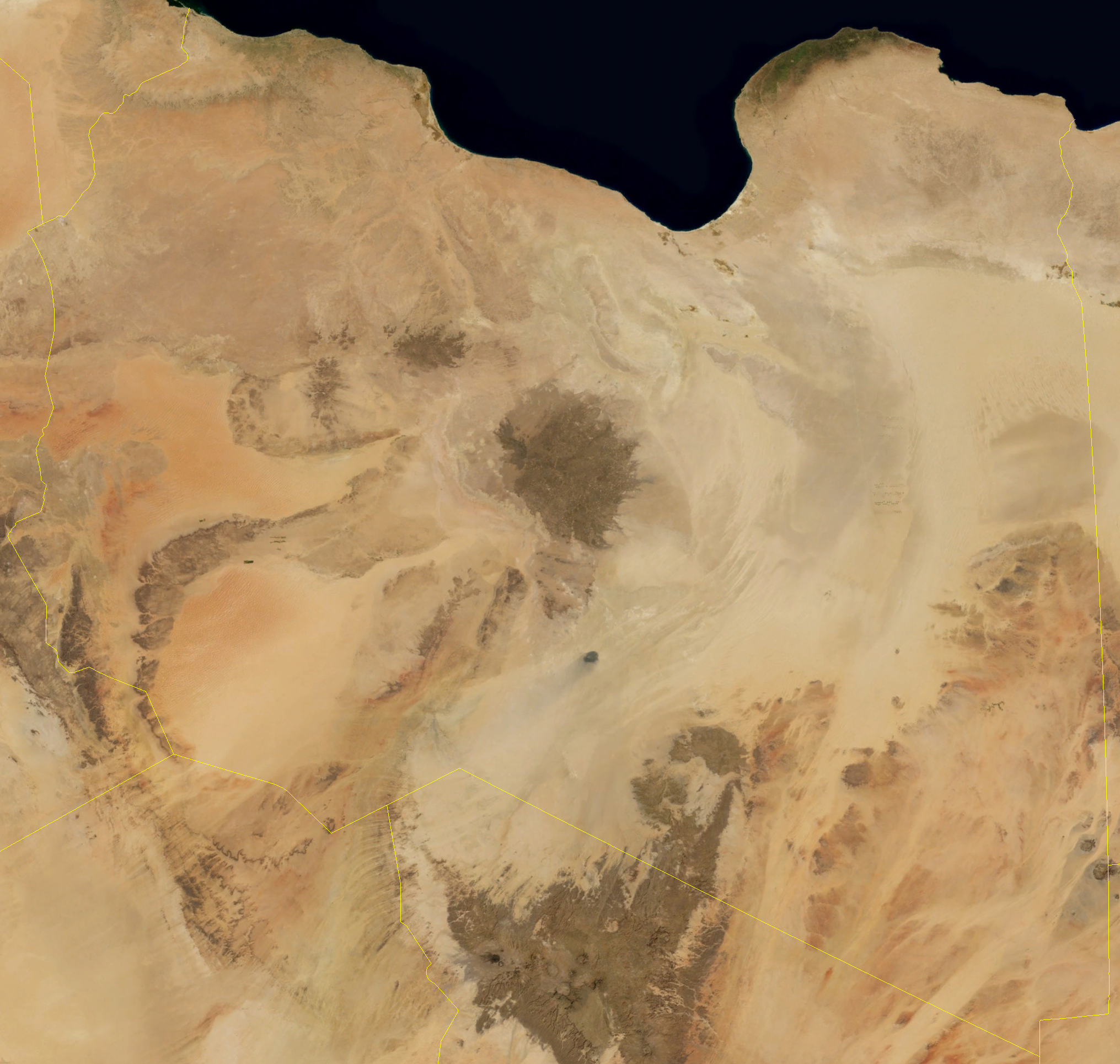
Satellite image of Libya (international boundaries added) with Cyrenaica on the right side, showing the green Mediterranean coast in the north and the large desert in the centre and south

Geologically, Cyrenaica rests on a mass of Miocene limestone that tilts up steeply from the Mediterranean Sea and falls inland with a gradual descent to sea level again.

This mass is divided into two blocks. The Jebel Akhdar extends parallel to the coast from the Gulf of Sidra to the Gulf of Bomba and reaches an elevation of 882 meters. There is no continuous coastal plain, the longest strip running from the recess of Gulf of Sidra past Benghazi to Tolmeita. Thereafter, except for deltaic patches at Susa and Derna, the shore is all precipitous. A steep escarpment separates the coastal plain from a relatively level plateau, known as the Marj Plain, which lies at about 300 meters elevation. Above the Marj Plain lies a dissected plateau at about 700 meters elevation, which contains the highest peaks in the range.

The Jebel Akhdar and its adjacent coast are part of the Mediterranean woodlands and forests ecoregion and have a Mediterranean climate of hot, dry summers and relatively mild and rainy winters. The plant communities of this portion of Cyrenaica include forest, woodland, maquis, garrigue, steppe and oak savanna. Garrigue shrublands occupy the non-agricultural portions coastal plain and coastal escarpments, with Sarcopoterium spinosum, along with Asphodelus ramosus and Artemisia herba-alba, as the predominant species. Small areas of maquis are found on north-facing slopes near the sea, becoming more extensive on the lower plateau. Juniperus phoenicea, Pistacia lentiscus, Quercus coccifera and Ceratonia siliqua are common tree and large shrub species in the maquis. The upper plateau includes areas of garrigue, two maquis communities, one dominated by Pistacia lentiscus and the other a mixed maquis in which the endemic Arbutus pavarii is prominent, and forests of Cupressus sempervirens, Juniperus phoenicea, Olea europaea, Quercus coccifera, Ceratonia siliqua, and Pinus halepensis.

Areas of red soil are found on the Marj Plain, which has borne abundant crops of wheat and barley from ancient times to the present day. Plenty of springs issue on the highlands. Wild olive trees are abundant, and large areas of oak savanna provide pasture to the flocks and herds of the local Bedouins. Historically large areas of range were covered in forest. The forested area of the Jebel Akhdar has been shrinking in recent decades. A 1996 report to the UN Food and Agriculture Organization estimated that the forested area was reduced to 320,000 hectares from 500,000 hectares, mostly cleared to grow crops. The Green Mountain Conservation and Development Authority estimates that the forested area decreased from 500,000 hectares in 1976 to 180,000 hectares in 2007.

The southward slopes of the Jebel Akhdar are occupied by the Mediterranean dry woodlands and steppe, a transitional ecoregion lying between the Mediterranean climate regions of North Africa and the hyper-arid Sahara.

The lower Jebel el-Akabah lies to the south and east of the Jebel Akhdar. The two highlands are separated by a depression. This eastern region, known in ancient times as Marmarica, is much drier than the Jebel Akhdar and here the Sahara extends to the coast. Historically, salt-collecting and sponge fishing were more important than agriculture. Bomba and Tobruk have good harbors.

South of the coastal highlands of Cyrenaica is a large east–west running depression, extending eastward from the Gulf of Sidra into Egypt. This region of the Sahara is known as the Libyan Desert, and includes the Great Sand Sea and the Calanshio Sand Sea. The Libyan Desert is home to a few oases, including Awjila and Jaghbub.

== History ==
=== Berber people ===
The Ancient Libyans were the earliest recorded inhabitants of Cyrenaica.

=== Late Bronze Age ===
==== Egyptian period ====
Egyptian records mention that during the New Kingdom of Egypt (thirteenth century BC), the Libu and Meshwesh tribes of Cyrenaica made frequent incursions into Egypt.

=== Iron Age ===
==== Greek colonization ====
Cyrenaica was colonized by the Greeks beginning in the seventh century BC, when it was known as Kyrenaïka. The first and most important colony was that of Cyrene, established in about 631 BC by colonists from the Greek island of Thera, which they had abandoned because of a severe famine. Their commander, Aristoteles, took the new name of Battos. His descendants, known as the Battiadae, persisted despite severe conflict with Greeks in neighboring cities.

The eastern portion of the province, with no major population centers, was called Marmarica; the more important western portion was known as the Pentapolis, as it comprised five cities: Cyrene (near the modern village of Shahat) with its port of Apollonia (Marsa Susa), Arsinoe or Taucheira (Tocra), Euesperides or Berenice (near modern Benghazi), Balagrae (Bayda) and Barce (Marj) – of which the chief was the eponymous Cyrene. The term "Pentapolis" continued to be used as a synonym for Cyrenaica. In the south, the Pentapolis faded into the Saharan tribal areas, including the pharaonic oracle of Ammonium.

The region produced barley, wheat, olive oil, wine, figs, apples, wool, sheep, cattle, and silphium, a herb that grew only in Cyrenaica and was regarded as a medicinal cure and aphrodisiac.

Cyrene became one of the greatest intellectual and artistic centers of the Greek world, famous for its medical school, learned academies and architecture, which included some of the finest examples of the Hellenistic style. The Cyrenaics, a school of thinkers who expounded a doctrine of moral cheerfulness that defined happiness as the sum of human pleasures, were founded by Aristippus of Cyrene. Other notable natives of Cyrene were the poet Callimachus and the mathematicians Theodorus and Eratosthenes.

=== Classical Age ===
==== Persian period ====
In 525 BC, after conquering Egypt, the Achaemenid (Persian) army of Cambyses II seized the Pentapolis, and established a satrapy (Achaemenid Persian province) over parts of the region for about the next two centuries.

==== Hellenistic period ====
The Persians were followed by Alexander the Great in 332 BC, who received tribute from the cities after taking Egypt. The Pentapolis was formally annexed by Ptolemy I Soter, and through him passed to the diadoch dynasty of the Lagids, better known as the Ptolemaic dynasty. It briefly gained independence under Magas of Cyrene, stepson of Ptolemy I, but was reabsorbed into the Ptolemaic empire after his death. It was separated from the main kingdom by Ptolemy VIII and given to his son Ptolemy Apion, who, dying without heirs in 96 BC, bequeathed it to the Roman Republic.

==== Roman period ====
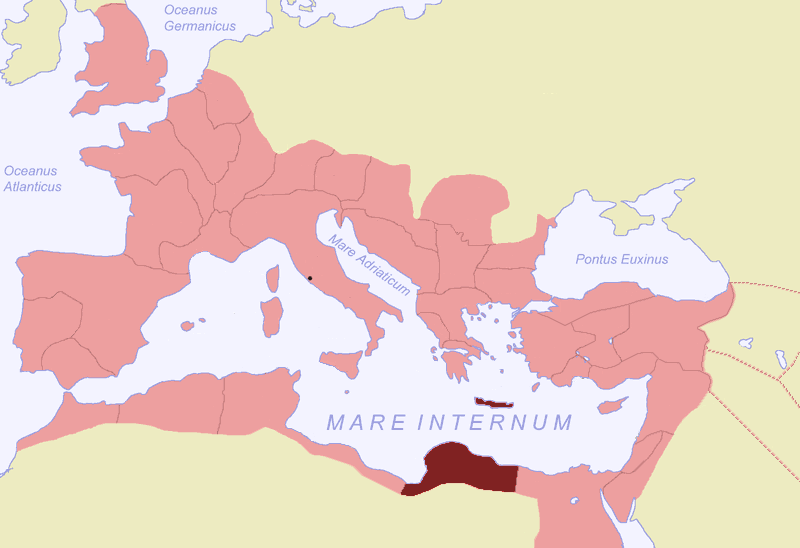
Crete and Cyrenaica, 2nd century Roman Empire

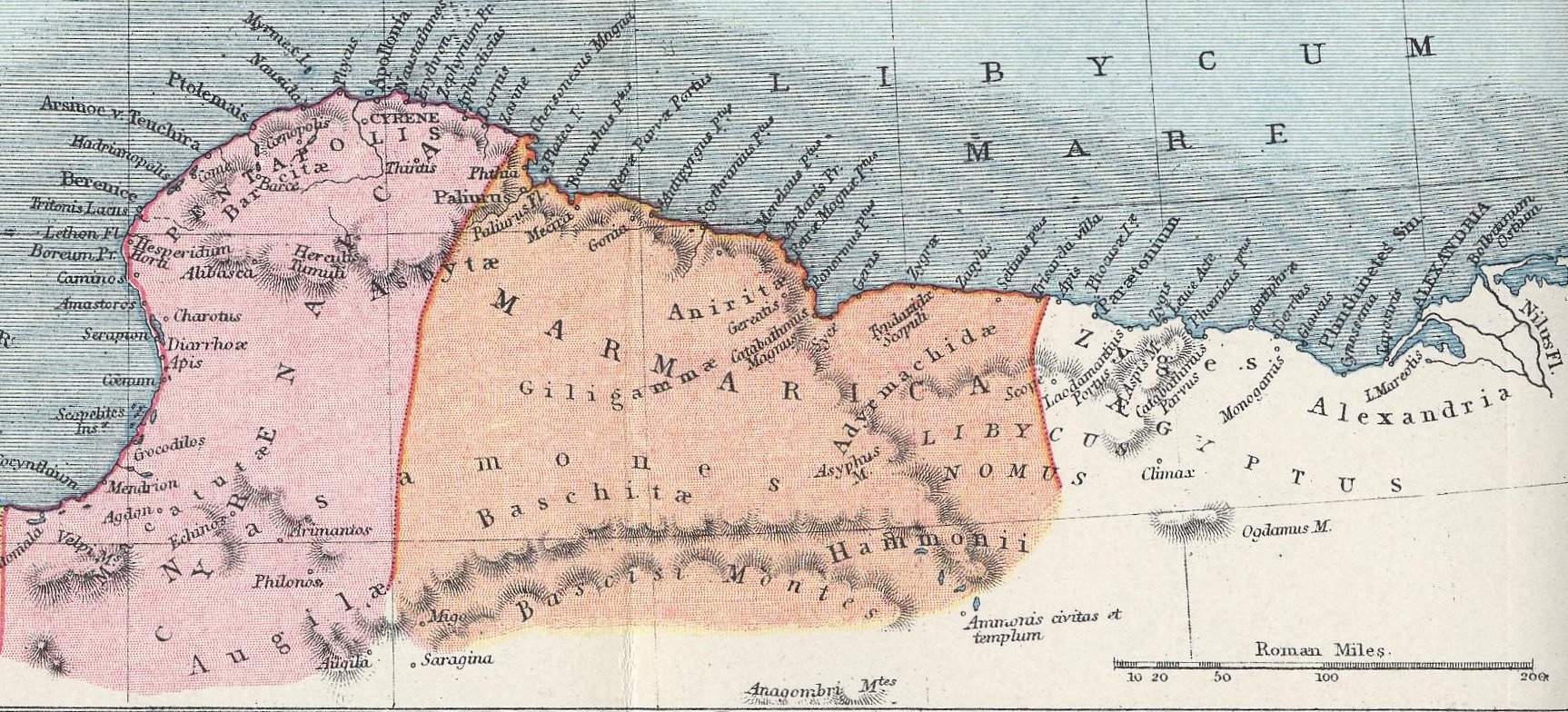
Map of Cyrenaica and Marmarica in the Roman era (Samuel Butler, 1907)

The Latin name Cyrenaica (or Kyrenika) dates to the first century BC. Although some confusion exists as to the exact territory Rome inherited, by 78 BC it was organized as one administrative province together with Crete. It became a senatorial province in 20 BC, like its far more prominent western neighbor Africa proconsularis, and unlike Egypt itself, which became an imperial domain sui generis (under a special governor styled praefectus augustalis) in 30 BC.

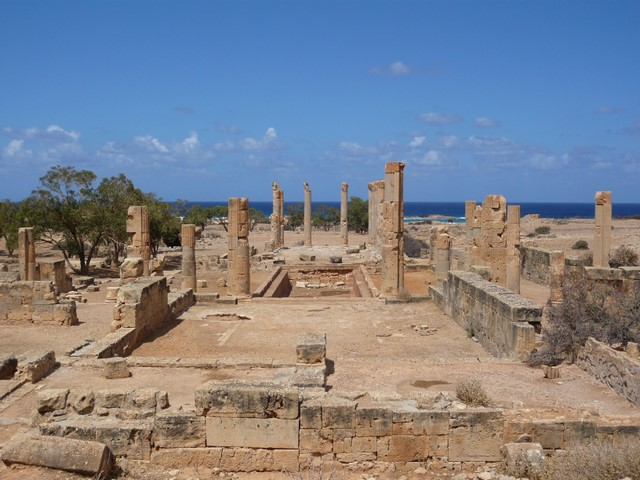
Ruins of the Palazzo delle Colonne, a Hellenistic-period elite residence in Ptolemais, Cyrenaica

Diocletian's Tetrarchy reforms of 293 altered Cyrenaica's administrative structure. It was split into two provinces: Libya Superior or Libya Pentapolis, comprising the above-mentioned Pentapolis, with Ptolemais as its capital, and Libya Inferior or Libya Sicca, comprising Marmarica, with the important port city of Paraetonium as its capital. Each came under a governor holding the modest rank of praeses. Both belonged to the Diocese of the Orient, with its capital at Antioch in Syria, and from 370, to the Diocese of Egypt, within the Praetorian prefecture of Oriens. Its western neighbor Tripolitania, the largest split-off from Africa proconsularis, became part of the Diocese of Africa, subordinate to the prefecture of Italia et Africa. Following the Crete earthquake of 365, the capital was moved to Ptolemais. After the Empire's division, Cyrenaica became part of the Eastern Roman Empire (Byzantine Empire), bordering Tripolitania.

The Tabula Peutingeriana shows Pentapolites to the east of Syrtes Maiores, indicating the cities of Bernice, Hadrianopolis, Taucheira, Ptolomaide, Callis, Cenopolis, Balacris and Cyrene.

==== Christianization ====
According to the Synoptic Gospels, Simon of Cyrene carried the cross of Jesus Christ to the crucifixion.

According to one tradition, Mark the Evangelist was born in the Pentapolis, and later returned after preaching with Paul the Apostle in Colosse (Col 4:10) and Rome (Phil 24; 2 Tim 4:11); from Pentapolis he made his way to Alexandria.

Alexandrian Church Early Christianity spread to Pentapolis from Egypt; Synesius of Cyrene (370–414), bishop of Ptolemais, received his instruction at Alexandria in both the Catechetical School and the Mouseion, and he entertained a great deal of reverence and affection for Hypatia, the last pagan Neoplatonist, whose classes he had attended. Synesius was raised to the episcopate by Theophilus, patriarch of Alexandria, in 410. Since the First Council of Nicaea in 325, Cyrenaica had been recognized as an ecclesiastical province of the See of Alexandria, per the ruling of the Nicaean Fathers.The patriarch of the Coptic Church to this day includes the Pentapolis in his title as an area within his jurisdiction.

The Eparchy of the Western Pentapolis was part of the Coptic Orthodox Church, as the Pope of Alexandria was the Pope of Africa. The most senior position in The Holy Synod of the Coptic Orthodox Church after the Pope was the Metropolitan of Western Pentapolis, although, since its demise as a major Archiepiscopal Metropolis in the days of Pope John VI of Alexandria, it was held as a Titular See attached to another Diocese.

After being repeatedly destroyed and restored during the Roman period Pentapolis became a mere borough, but was nevertheless the site of a diocese. Its bishop, Zopyrus, was present at the First Council of Nicaea in 325. The subscriptions at Ephesus (431) and Chalcedon (451) give the names of two other bishops, Zenobius and Theodorus.

Although it retained the title "Pentapolis", the ecclesiastic province actually included all of the Cyrenaica, not just the five cities. Pentapolis is still included in the title of Popes of the Coptic Orthodox Church and the Greek Orthodox Church of Alexandria.

=== Middle Ages ===
==== Arab and Ottoman rule ====
Cyrenaica was conquered by Muslim Arabs under command of Amr ibn al-As during the tenure of the second caliph, Omar, in c. 642, and became known as Barqah after its provincial capital, the ancient city of Barce. After the breakdown of the Umayyad Caliphate it was essentially annexed to Egypt, although still under the same name, first under the Fatimid caliphs. The region became a base for piracy, and many of the pirates acted as privateers for the Fatimids. Around 1051/52, Jabbara, emir of Barqa, transferred his allegiance from the Fatimids to the Zirids.

In the middle of the 11th century, several Arab tribes, including the Bedouin Banu Hilal confederation devastated the North African coast under Zirid control. Barqa was ravaged by the Hilalian invasion and left to be settled by the Banu Sulaym while the Banu Hilal marched westwards. The invasion contributed to the decline of the port cities and maritime trade. Up to 200,000 Hilalian families migrated into Cyrenaica from Egypt. As a result of the migration by Arab tribes, Cyrenaica became more Arab than any place in the Arab world except for the interior of Arabia. The Ayyubid emir Qaraqush marched into the Maghreb and according to al-Maqrizi had taken control of Cyrenaica on orders of Saladin who wanted to use the province as an agricultural base. The Mamluks were seemingly unable to exert any significant control and had to ally with the resident Bedouins to accept their suzerainty indirectly while paying taxes. The Ottoman Empire later claimed suzerainty of Cyrenaica based on the Mamluk claim of suzerainty through alliance with the tribes. Cyrenaica was subsumed into Ottoman Libya.

=== Modern Age ===
In 1879, Cyrenaica became a wilayah of the Ottoman Empire. In 1888, it became a mutasarrıfiyya under a mutasarrif and was further divided into five qadaas. The wali of Ottoman Tripolitania, however, looked after the military and judicial affairs. The bureaucratic setup was similar to the one in Tripoli. The mutasarrifate existed until the Italian invasion.

==== Italian colonial rule ====
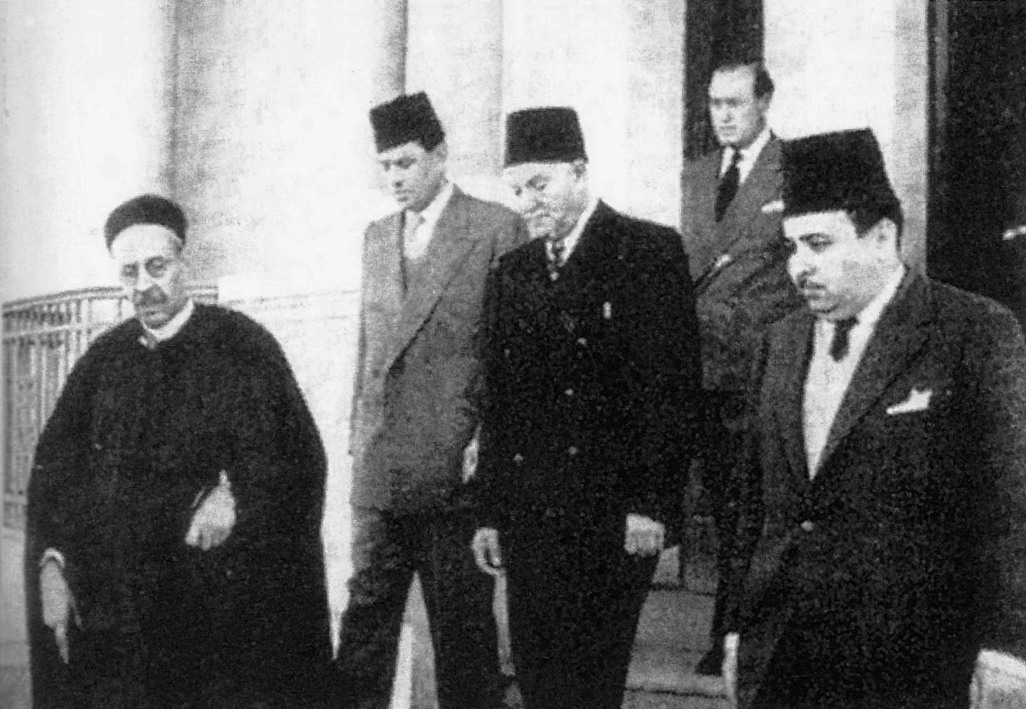
Emir Idris as-Senussi (left), and behind him (from left) Hussein Maziq, Muhammad Sakizli and Mustafa Ben Halim, formed the government of Cyrenaica in late 1940s.

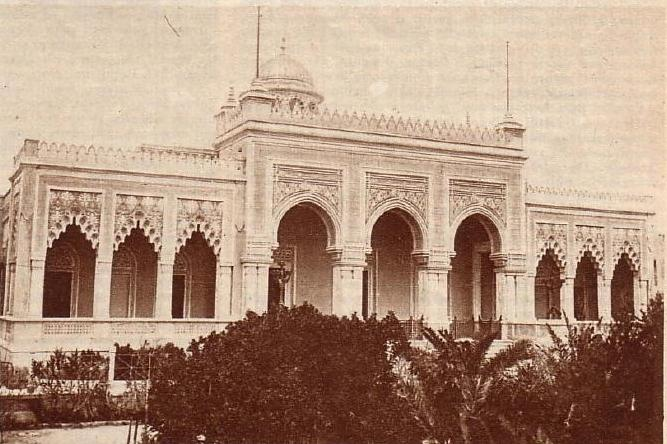
Littorio Palace in Benghazi was the seat of the Cyrenaican assembly.

The Italians occupied Cyrenaica during the Italo-Turkish War in 1911 and declared it an Italian protectorate on 15 October 1912. Three days later, the Ottoman Empire officially ceded the province to the Kingdom of Italy. On 17 May 1919, Cyrenaica was established as an Italian colony, and, on 25 October 1920, the Italian government recognized Sheikh Sidi Idriss as the leader of the Senussi, who was granted the princely rank of emir until 1929. In that year, Italy withdrew recognition of him and the Senussi. On 1 January 1934, Tripolitania, Cyrenaica, and Fezzan were united as the Italian colony of Libya.

The Italian fascists constructed the Marble Arch as a form of an imperial triumphal arch at the border between Cyrenaica and Tripolitani near the coast.

There was heavy fighting in Cyrenaica during World War II on the part of the Allies against the Italian Army and the Nazi German Afrika Korps. In late 1942, Allied forces liberated Cyrenaica from Axis occupation and the United Kingdom administered most of Libya through 1951, when the Kingdom of Libya was established and granted independence.

==== Emirate of Cyrenaica ====
Flag of the short-lived emirate of Cyrenaica, 1949–1951

In 1949, Idris al-Senussi, with British backing, proclaimed the independent Emirate of Cyrenaica. This emirate became part of the Kingdom of Libya when it was established, and an independent kingdom on 24 December 1951, with Idris al-Senussi becoming King Idris.

==== Gaddafi's regime ====
Since 1 September 1969, when the Senussi dynasty was overthrown by Colonel Muammar Gaddafi, Cyrenaica occasionally experienced nationalist activity against Gaddafi's military dictatorship, including a military rebellion at Tobruk in 1980.

In 2007, the Green Mountain Conservation and Development Authority, headed by Saif al-Islam Gaddafi, announced a regional plan for Cyrenaica, developed by the firm Foster and Partners. The plan, known as The Cyrene Declaration, aimed to revive Cyrenaica's agriculture, create a national park and develop the region as a cultural and eco-tourism destination. The announced pilot projects included plans for three hotels, including the Cyrene Grand Hotel near the ruins of Cyrene.

==== Libyan civil war ====
For much of the Libyan civil war, Cyrenaica was largely under the control of the National Transitional Council while Tripolitania and Fezzan remained under Gaddafi's government control.

Since 2017, all of eastern Libya has been controlled by the Libyan National Army, led by Marshal Khalifa Haftar, who has governed the region as a military dictator.

== Episcopal sees ==
Ancient episcopal sees of the Roman province of Libya Superior or Libya Pentapolitana listed in the Annuario Pontificio as titular sees:

- Barca
- Berenice (Benghazi)
- Boreum (Tabibbi)
- Cyrene
- Dystis
- Erythrum (Uaili-Et-Trun)
- Olbia
- Ptolemais in Libya
- Sozusa in Libya

For the ancient sees of Libya Inferior, see Marmarica.
For those of Creta, see Byzantine Crete.

== See also ==
- Cyrenaics philosophical school
- List of kings of Cyrene
- List of Catholic dioceses in Libya
- List of colonial heads of Cyrenaica
- Mediterranean dry woodlands and steppe
- Postage stamps and postal history of Cyrenaica
- History of Libya
- Christianity in Libya
- Islam in Libya

== Sources and external links ==
- Cyrenaica Archaeological Project.
- Inscriptions of Roman Cyrenaica
- Lexiorient.com's article on Cyrenaica.
- Dynamic map of Cyrenaica on Google Maps.
- Worldstatesmen.org's History and list of rulers of Tripolitania, Cyrenaica.
- Hostkingdom.net's History and list of rulers of Cyrenaica.
- Zum.de's History of Cyrenaica.
