= 515 BC =

515 BC in various calendars
- Gregorian calendar: 515 BC; DXV BC
- Ab urbe condita: 239
- Ancient Egypt era: XXVII dynasty, 11
- Pharaoh: Darius I of Persia, 7
- Ancient Greek Olympiad (summer): 66th Olympiad, year 2
- Assyrian calendar: 4236
- Balinese saka calendar: N/A
- Bengali calendar: −1108 – −1107
- Berber calendar: 436
- Buddhist calendar: 30
- Burmese calendar: −1152
- Byzantine calendar: 4994–4995
- Chinese calendar: 乙酉年 (Wood Rooster); 2183 or 1976 — to — 丙戌年 (Fire Dog); 2184 or 1977
- Coptic calendar: −798 – −797
- Discordian calendar: 652
- Ethiopian calendar: −522 – −521
- Hebrew calendar: 3246–3247
- Hindu calendars
- Vikram Samvat: −458 – −457
- Shaka Samvat: N/A
- Kali Yuga: 2586–2587
- Holocene calendar: 9486
- Iranian calendar: 1136 BP – 1135 BP
- Islamic calendar: 1171 BH – 1170 BH
- Javanese calendar: N/A
- Julian calendar: N/A
- Korean calendar: 1819
- Minguo calendar: 2426 before ROC 民前2426年
- Nanakshahi calendar: −1982
- Thai solar calendar: 28–29
- Tibetan calendar: ཤིང་མོ་བྱ་ལོ་ (female Wood-Bird) −388 or −769 or −1541 — to — མེ་ཕོ་ཁྱི་ལོ་ (male Fire-Dog) −387 or −768 or −1540

The year 515 BC was a year of the pre-Julian Roman calendar. In the Roman Empire, it was known as year 239Ab urbe condita. The denomination 515 BC for this year has been used since the early medieval period, when the Anno Domini calendar era became the prevalent method in Europe for naming years.

== Events ==
=== By topic ===
==== Art and architecture ====
- February 25 – The Second Temple in Jerusalem is completed.
- Construction of Persepolis begins.
- Euphronios creates the Death of Sarpedon, a red-figure decoration on a calyx krater. It is now in the collection of the National Archaeological Museum of Cerveteri.

== Births ==
- Parmenides, Greek religious philosopher (d. 450 BC)

== Deaths ==
- Arcesilaus III of Cyrene, the sixth Greek Cyrenaean King, was assassinated in 515 BC
- King Liao of Wu (Chinese: 吳王僚), king of the state of Wu in the Spring and Autumn period from 526 to 515 BC, assassinated by Zhuan Zhu in 515 BC
- Pheretima (Cyrenaean Queen), wife of the Greek Cyrenaean King Battus III and the last recorded queen of the Battiad dynasty in Cyrenaica
- Polycrates, son of Aeaces, the tyrant of Samos from c. 538 BC to 522 BC
- Zhuan Zhu, an assassin in the Spring and Autumn period.
