= Archelaus =

Archelaus is a masculine given name which may refer to:

== People ==
- Archelaus (alchemist), author of a long poem in iambics called "Περὶ τῆς ῾Ιερᾶς Τέχνης"
- Archelaus (geographer), author of a work on the countries visited by Alexander the Great
- Archelaus, a rhetorician mentioned by Diogenes Laërtius (2.17)
- Archelaus of Sparta (r. 790–760 BC), Agiad king of Sparta
- Archelaus (philosopher) (fl. 5th century BC), pupil of Anaxagoras
- Archelaus of Macedon (r. 413–399 BC), king of Macedon
- Archelaus (son of Amyntas III) (d. 359 BC), half-brother of Philip II of Macedonia
- Archelaus (son of Androcles) (fl. 321 BC), phrourarch of Aornus
- Archelaus (phrourarch) (fl. 326 BC), phrourarch of Tyre
- Archelaus of Priene (fl. c. 300 BC), an ancient Greek sculptor
- Archelaus Chersonesita (fl. 3rd century BC), Egyptian epigrammatist
- Archelaus (Pontic army officer) (died 63 BC), general of Mithridates VI of Pontus
- Archelaus (high priest of Comana Cappadocia) (died 55 BC), priest of Bellona in Comana, Cappadocia
- Archelaus (father of Archelaus of Cappadocia) (fl. 55–47 BC), priest of Bellona in Comana, Cappadocia
- Archelaus of Cappadocia (r. 36 BC–17 AD), king of Cappadocia
- Archelaus of Cilicia (died 38 AD), king of Cicilia Trachaea and Eastern Lycaonia
- Archelaus the deacon (died 235 AD), a saint martyred with Quiriacus of Ostia
- Archelaus (bishop of Carrhae) (fl. 278 AD), a bishop who held a public dispute with Manichaean heretics
- Archelaus (bishop of Caesarea) (fl. 5th century AD), bishop who wrote against the Messalian heresy
- Archelaus Tupper (died 1781), a Vermont militia sergeant killed by British soldiers

== Mythical figures ==
- Archelaus (son of Temenus)
- Archelaus, son of Heracles
- Archelaus, son of Electryon and Anaxo, killed by the sons of Pterelaus
- Archelaus, son of Aegyptus, killed by his wife, Anaxibia, daughter of Danaus

== See also ==
- Arcesilaus (disambiguation), a name commonly transliterated as "Archelaus"
