= Arcesilaus (disambiguation) =

Arcesilaus (316/5–241/0 BC) was a Greek philosopher.

Arcesilaus or Arkesilaos (/ˌɑːrsɛsɪˈleɪ.əs/; Ancient Greek: Ἀρκεσίλαος) is a Greek name (Arcesilaus is the Latin spelling), which may also refer to:

== People ==
=== Four Kings of Cyrene ===
- Arcesilaus I of Cyrene (fl. 7th–6th centuries BC)
- Arcesilaus II of Cyrene (fl. 6th century BC)
- Arcesilaus III of Cyrene (fl. 6th century BC)
- Arcesilaus IV of Cyrene (fl. 5th century BC)

=== Others ===
- Arcesilaus (mythology), one of the Greek leaders in the Trojan War
- Arcesilaus (satrap) (fl. 4th century BC), one of Alexander the Great's generals
- Arcesilaus (sculptor) (fl. 1st century), Roman sculptor
- Arcesilaus (consul) (fl. 3rd century AD), Roman senator appointed consul in AD 267

== Astronomy ==
- 20961 Arkesilaos, an asteroid

== See also ==
- Archelaus (disambiguation), a name commonly transliterated as "Arcesilaus"
