= Libya (satrapy) =

Province of the Achaemenid Persian Empire

Achaemenid Libya
𐎱𐎢𐎫𐎠𐎹, Putāyaʰ

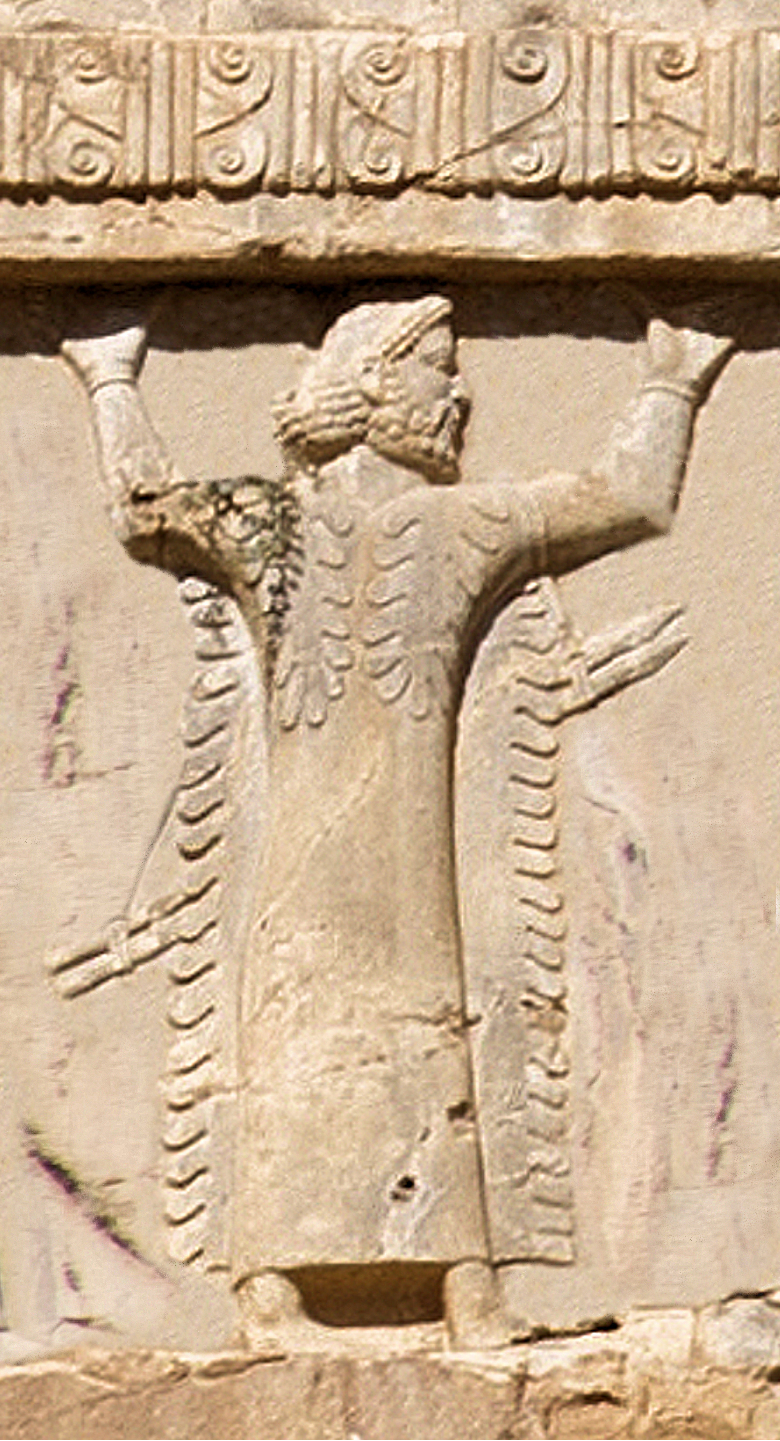
Libyan soldier of the Achaemenid army, circa 480 BCE. Xerxes I tomb relief.

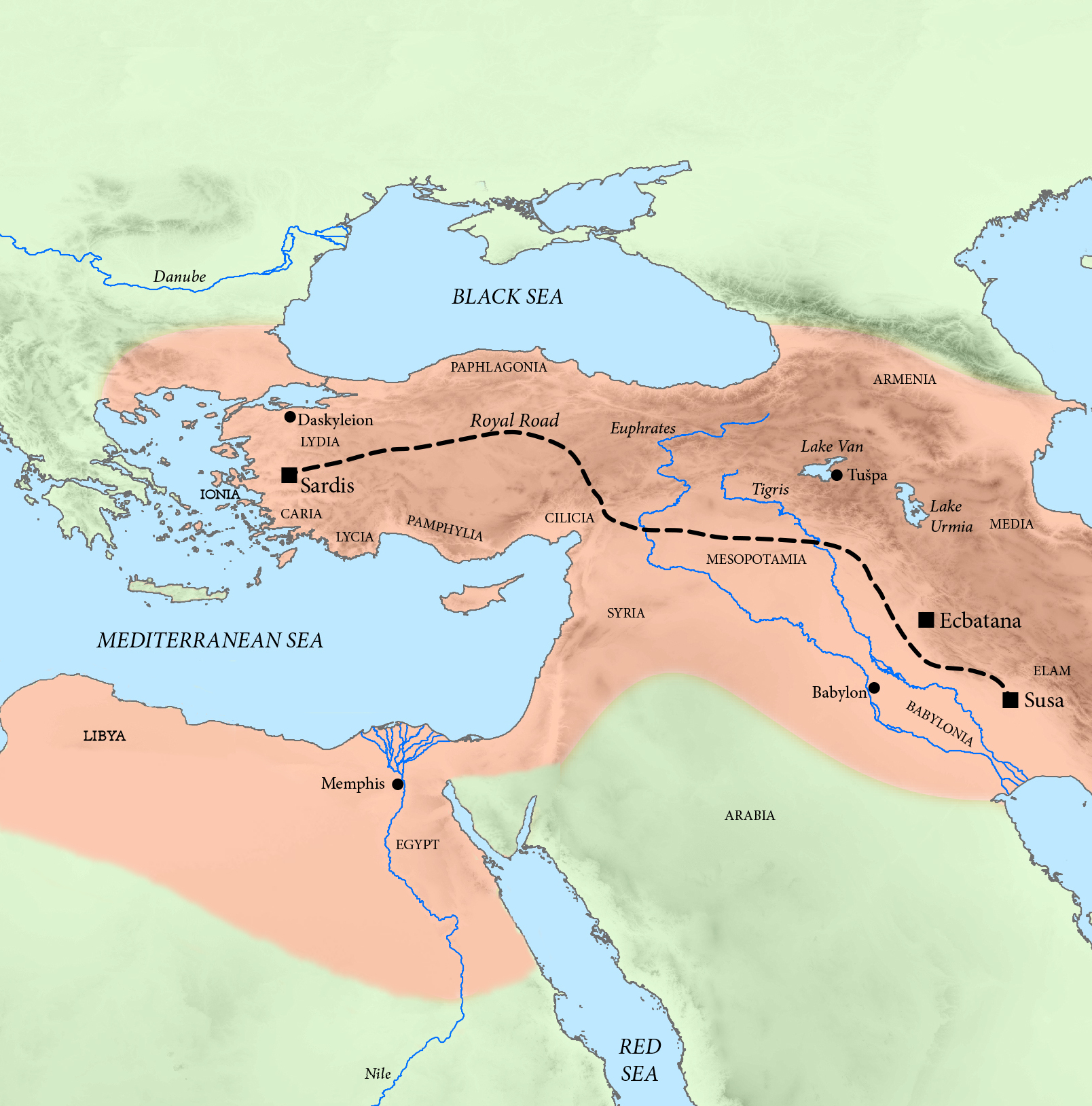
Western part of the Achaemenid Empire at its greatest extent, circa 500 BCE.

Libya (Old Persian: 𐎱𐎢𐎫𐎠𐎹, romanized: Putāyaʰ) was a satrapy of the Achaemenid Empire, that corresponded to the current region of eastern Libya (Cyrenaica), according to Darius I's Naqsh-e Rustam and Xerxes I's Daiva inscription. It is also mentioned as being part of the 6th district by Herodotus, which also included Cyrene, a Greek colony in Libya.

When Cambyses II conquered Egypt, the king of Cyrene, Arcesilaus III, sided with Persia. When he was killed trying to maintain power, Queen Pheretima invited the Persians to take Cyrene. The satrap of Egypt, Aryandes, accepted, sending an army under two Persians to support Pheretime. The expedition lasted nearly a year and resulted in the subjugation of the Libyans; the Persians penetrated as far west as the Euhesperides (Benghazi). A puppet king, Battus IV, was installed, and the current region of eastern Libya (Cyrenaica) was made into a Persian satrapy. It is possible that Cyrene gained independence with the rebellion of Egypt in 404 BCE, but certainly, Achaemenid control of the region was lost after Alexander's conquests.

== Subjugation of Cyrenaica ==
The region's integration into the Achaemenid sphere began with Cambyses II’s conquest of Egypt in 525 BCE. Recognizing the growing power of the Persians, Arcesilaus III, king of Cyrene, sought an alliance with them. However, his efforts to consolidate power within the city led to his assassination, throwing Cyrene into political turmoil. Seizing the opportunity, his mother, Queen Pheretima, called upon the Persian satrap of Egypt, Aryandes, to restore order and avenge her son’s death.

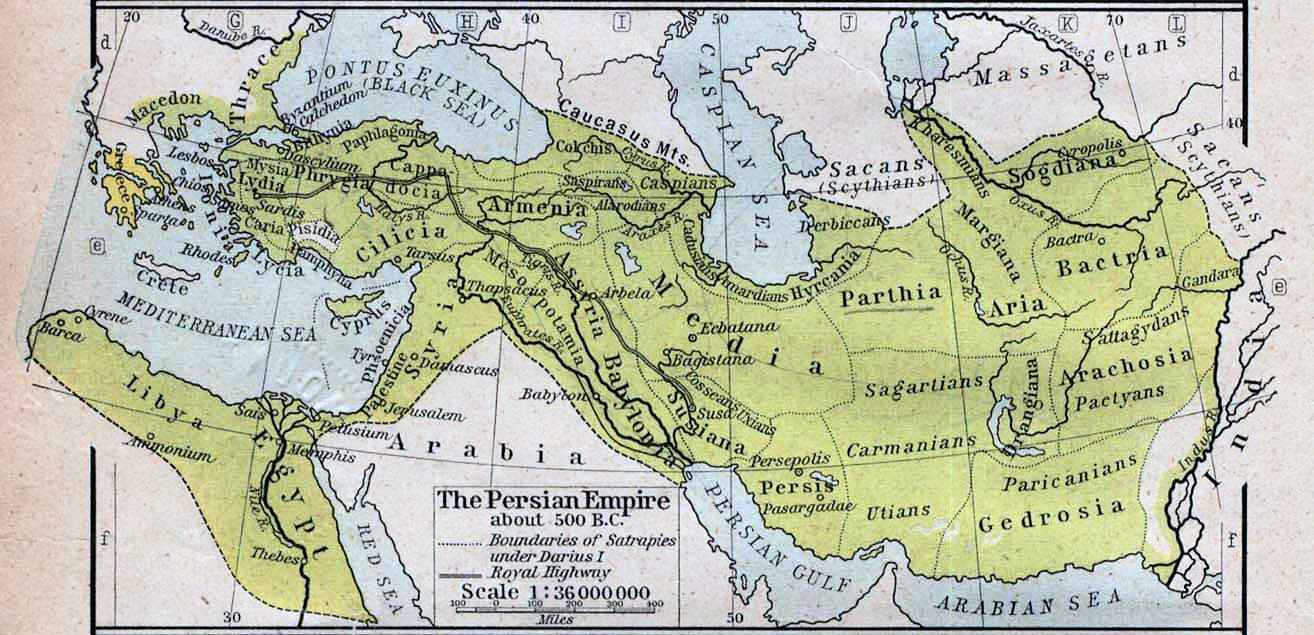
c.500 BCE

Aryandes responded with a military expedition, dispatching a force led by two Persian commanders to suppress resistance in Cyrenaica. Over the course of a year, the Persians subdued the Libyan cities, reportedly advancing as far west as Euhesperides (modern Benghazi). The campaign was characterized by brutal reprisals, particularly against those who had opposed Pheretima. According to Herodotus, she exacted a horrific vengeance upon her enemies, displaying the corpses of the city's ruling elite in a gruesome spectacle of impalement.

== Administration ==
Following the conquest, the Persians installed a client ruler, Battus IV, from the established Greek Battiad dynasty, ensuring Cyrene’s subservience to the empire. The broader region of Cyrenaica was then formally incorporated as a satrapy under Achaemenid control, likely administered from Egypt.

The exact duration of Persian rule in Libya remains uncertain. With Egypt’s rebellion against Persian authority in 404 BCE, it is possible that Cyrene and the surrounding territories regained independence, though no definitive records confirm this. Achaemenid influence in the region came to a permanent end in the late fourth century BCE when Alexander the Great’s campaigns dismantled Persian hegemony across North Africa and the Near East.

While brief, Achaemenid rule over Libya reflected the empire’s far-reaching ambitions and its ability to extend control deep into the Mediterranean world. The Persian presence in Cyrenaica left a legacy of political upheaval and cultural interactions between the Greek settlers, native Libyans and the imperial forces of the east.
