= Ladice (Cyrenaean princess) =

Wife of the Egyptian pharaoh Amasis II (548–526 BC)

Ladice or Ladice of Cyrene (Greek: Λαδίκη, fl. 548 BC to 526 BC) was a Greek Cyrenaean princess and a member of the Battiad dynasty. She married the ancient Egyptian pharaoh Amasis II. When Amasis died in 526 BC, she returned from Egypt back to Cyrene, in modern-day Libya.

== Family ==
Ladice's was the daughter of Battus III, King of Cyrene, and his wife Queen Pheretima. Her brother would be the future sixth Greek Cyrenaean king Arcesilaus III. Although her maternal grandparents are unknown, her paternal grandparents were the fourth Greek Cyrenaean king Arcesilaus II and Greek Cyrenaean queen Eryxo. Although her father is considered to have been Battus III, Herodotus suggests that, based on other accounts, her father could have been Arcesilaus II or Critobulus, one of the leading Greek Cyrenaean citizens.

She married Amasis II, pharaoh of Egypt. It is unknown whether they had any children but through her marriage, Ladice had at least two stepsons Prince Amose and Psamtik III.

== Marriage ==
Battus III allied with Pharaoh Amasis II to protect Cyrenaica from the local Libyan population and its aristocracy. Battus allowed Amasis to select a Greek woman from Cyrenaica to marry him. Amasis chose Battus' daughter Ladice. Ladice and Amasis married in Cyrene.

When Ladice married Amasis, she became a member of the Twenty-sixth Dynasty of Egypt. Ladice is not well known in ancient Egyptian history and her name has not been found on any monuments from the time. Nor is she mentioned on any Egyptian inscriptions from the period. However, her marriage to Amasis encouraged cultural and trade interactions between Egypt and its neighbours on the Mediterranean.

According to Herodotus, it was said that when Amasis and Ladice returned to his palace in Sais, Egypt, their marriage, for a while, was not consummated. Every time Amasis went to bed with Ladice, he was unable to have intercourse with her, although he did with his other wives. Amasis thought that Ladice might have bewitched him and formally accused Ladice. If she was found guilty, the punishment would have been the death penalty. She denied the charge, but to no effect. Ladice prayed to the Greek goddess of love, Aphrodite, promising to dedicate a statue to her in Cyrene if the goddess saved her life and her marriage. The goddess answered her prayer and her marriage was consummated and the pharaoh fell deeply in love with her. Amasis withdrew his accusation against Ladice. Ladice ordered a statue to be made in the image of Aphrodite and she sent the statue to Cyrene, where it was placed looking outward from the city. The statue was still there in the time of Herodotus.

== Return to Cyrene ==
When Amasis died in 526 BC, Psamtik III became pharaoh and ruled until 525 BC, when king Cambyses II of Persia conquered Egypt. When Cambyses discovered who Ladice was, he sent her safely from Egypt back to Cyrene. After her return to Cyrene, no more is known about Ladice.

== See also ==
- List of Kings of Cyrene

== Sources ==
- Morkot, R., The Penguin Historical Atlas of Ancient Greece, Penguin Books, The Bath Press - Avon, Great Britain, 1996
- Herodotus, The Histories, Book 4
- https://web.archive.org/web/20081231121921/https://www.livius.org/ct-cz/cyrenaica/cyrenaica.html
- https://www.livius.org/am-ao/amasis/amasis.html
- http://www.reshafim.org.il/ad/egypt/history21-31.htm
