= 550 BC =

550 BC in various calendars
- Gregorian calendar: 550 BC; DL BC
- Ab urbe condita: 204
- Ancient Egypt era: XXVI dynasty, 115
- Pharaoh: Amasis II, 21
- Ancient Greek Olympiad (summer): 57th Olympiad, year 3
- Assyrian calendar: 4201
- Balinese saka calendar: N/A
- Bengali calendar: −1143 – −1142
- Berber calendar: 401
- Buddhist calendar: −5
- Burmese calendar: −1187
- Byzantine calendar: 4959–4960
- Chinese calendar: 庚戌年 (Metal Dog); 2148 or 1941 — to — 辛亥年 (Metal Pig); 2149 or 1942
- Coptic calendar: −833 – −832
- Discordian calendar: 617
- Ethiopian calendar: −557 – −556
- Hebrew calendar: 3211–3212
- Hindu calendars
- Vikram Samvat: −493 – −492
- Shaka Samvat: N/A
- Kali Yuga: 2551–2552
- Holocene calendar: 9451
- Iranian calendar: 1171 BP – 1170 BP
- Islamic calendar: 1207 BH – 1206 BH
- Javanese calendar: N/A
- Julian calendar: N/A
- Korean calendar: 1784
- Minguo calendar: 2461 before ROC 民前2461年
- Nanakshahi calendar: −2017
- Thai solar calendar: −7 – −6
- Tibetan calendar: ལྕགས་ཕོ་ཁྱི་ལོ་ (male Iron-Dog) −423 or −804 or −1576 — to — ལྕགས་མོ་ཕག་ལོ་ (female Iron-Boar) −422 or −803 or −1575

The year 550 BC was a year of the pre-Julian Roman calendar. In the Roman Empire, it was known as year 204 Ab urbe condita. The denomination 550 BC for this year has been used since the early medieval period, when the Anno Domini calendar era became the prevalent method in Europe for naming years.

== Events ==
- Greek colonization ends (approximate date).
- Cyrus II the Great overthrows Astyages of the Medes, establishing the Achaemenid Empire.
- Mago I begins his rule of Carthage and founds the Magonid dynasty.
- The Kingdom of Colchis is established.
- Abdera is destroyed by the Thracians.
- The Temple of Artemis is completed in Ephesus.
- The Temple of Hera I is built in what is now Paestum, Italy (approximate date).
- Siddhartha Gautama founds Buddhism in Northern India after achieving enlightenment after six years of practicing penance and meditation.

== Births ==
- Aristodemus of Cumae, tyrant of Cumae
- Hecataeus of Miletus, early Greek historian
- Miltiades, renowned Olympic chariot-racer
- Epicharmus, Greek poet
- Atossa, Achaemenid queen (approximate date)

== Deaths ==
- Arcesilaus II of Cyrene, the fourth Greek Cyrenaean King and a member of the Battiad dynasty; he was strangled by Learchus.
