= Battus III of Cyrene =

King of Cyrenaica from 550 to 530 BC

King of Cyrenaica
- Reign: 550-530 BC
- Predecessor: Learchus
- Successor: Arcesilaus III
- Born: Cyrene
- Died: 530 BC; Cyrene
- Spouse: Pheretima
- Issue: Arcesilaus III; Ladice
- Father: Arciselaus II
- Mother: Eryxo
- Religion: Greek polytheism

Battus III of Cyrene, surnamed The Lame (Greek: Βάττος ο Χωλός, flourished 6th century BC) was the fifth Greek Cyrenaean king and a member of the Battiad dynasty.

Battus was the son and only child of king Arcesilaus II and queen Eryxo. His paternal grandfather was the third Cyrenaean King, Battus II, while his paternal grandmother is unknown. His maternal grandmother was the princess Critola, while his maternal grandfather was a noble whose name is unknown and was murdered by Learchus (a rival to Arcesilaus II) in 550 BC. Battus II and Critola were siblings and were children to the second Cyrenaean King Arcesilaus I. Their paternal grandfather was the first Cyrenaean King, Battus I.

Battus received the surname The Lame because he was born with a defective leg that caused him to limp. Battus was proclaimed King in 550 BC by his maternal uncle Polyarchus, when his uncle and his mother Eryxo had successfully plotted to kill Learchus, who murdered Arcesilaus II and attempted to become king.

During his reign, Battus realised that Cyrenaica had become an unstable state, from the unstable relations with the Libyans, Egyptian Pharaoh Amasis II and the attempted overthrow of his late father and himself from Learchus. He visited the Oracle at Delphi for advice and consulted the priestess, on what he could do about Cyrenaica. The priestess advised Battus to go and visit Mantineia in Arcadia and ask for a man called Demonax, who could assist him to reform the Cyrenaean constitution. Demonax was held in high regard by the Mantineians and held a high position there.

Battus returned to Cyrene with Demonax to assist him in reforming the constitution. Demonax reformed the Cyrenaean constitution and did the following. He divided Cyrenaica into three groups:

- Greeks from Thera (modern Santorini)
- Greeks from the Peloponnese and Crete
- Greeks from the other Aegean Islands

Demonax created a Senate which controlled Cyrenaica. The senate's members were representatives from the three groups and the king was the senatorial president. The new constitution reduced the powers, responsibilities and authority of the king. The monarchy remained, but the king had only the authority to grant land to citizens and to function as a high priest in charge of religious duties. Demonax also put in place ephors to punish impostors and created a 300-strong armed police force patrolling and protecting Cyrenaica.

To further protect Cyrenaica from the Libyans and their aristocracy, Battus made an alliance with the Egyptian Pharaoh Amasis II. As a sign of gratitude, Battus allowed Amasis to marry a Greek woman from Cyrenaica. Amasis chose Battus' daughter, Ladice, and they married after 548 BC.

Battus reigned until his death in 530 BC, and was buried near his paternal ancestors. He was survived by his wife, queen Pheretima, their son Arcesilaus III and their daughter Ladice. He was succeeded by Arcesilaus III.

== See also ==
- List of Kings of Cyrene

== Sources ==
- Herodotus, The Histories, Book 4.
- https://www.livius.org/ct-cz/cyrenaica/cyrenaica.html
- http://www.mediterranees.net/dictionnaires/smith/cyrene.html

Battus III of Cyrene Battiad dynasty Died: 530 BC
Regnal titles
Preceded by Arcesilaus II	King of Cyrene; 550 BC – 530 BC	Succeeded by Arcesilaus III
