= Learchus (disambiguation) =

Learchus (Learchos, Learches) is a Greek name that may refer to:

- Learchus, the regicide of King Arcesilaus II of Cyrene
- Learches, a figure in Greek mythology
- Learchus, the governor of Cyzicus in Edmé Boursault's plays Les fables d'Esope and Esope à la cour
