= Demonax (disambiguation) =

Demonax (Greek: Δημώναξ, c. AD 70 – c. 170) was a Greek Cynic philosopher.

Demonax may also refer to:

- Demonax (lawmaker) (fl. 550 BC), Arcadian lawmaker
- Demonax (crater), lunar crater
- Demonax (beetle), a genus of the longhorn beetles in the family Cerambycidae
