= Demonax (lawmaker) =

6th-century BCE Greek lawmaker based in Cyrene

Demonax (Greek: Δημώναξ, Dēmōnax, gen.: Δημώνακτος) was an ancient Greek lawmaker of the style of Solon and Lycurgus, known for reforming the constitution of the Cyrenaeans.

== Life ==
Besides what is mentioned in the Histories by Herodotus, close to nothing is known about Demonax. He lived in the city of Mantineia, in Arcadia, in the sixth century BCE, and must have been alive around 550 BCE to be contemporaries with Battus III of Cyrene.

== Reforms ==
During the reign of Battus III the Lame, of Cyrene, Battus realised that Cyrenaica had become an unstable state, due to uneasy relations with the Libyans, as well as the enmity of Egyptian Pharaoh Amasis II, and the attempted dethronings of both himself and his late father, who had been strangled to death by his adviser, Learchus, who has been identified as either a brother or a friend. In response to such misfortunes, a Cyrenaean envoy visited the Oracle at Delphi for advice and consulted the priestess on what could be done to stabilize his kingdom. The priestess advised them to visit the city of Mantineia in Arcadia on the Peloponnesus and ask for a mediator. This they did, and in response to the request, the Mantineans sent their most distinguished citizen, Demonax, who would assist them in the reforming of the Cyrenaean constitution. Demonax, Battus was told, was held in high regard by the Mantineians and held a high position there.

=== Tribes ===
After conducting a thorough investigation of the community Demonax instigated several reforms. Demonax first divided the people of Cyrenaica into three groups, or tribes consisting of:

- Greeks from Thera and ethnic Libyans
- Greeks from the Peloponnesus and Crete
- Greeks from all other Aegean Islands

=== Monarchy and Senate ===
Demonax created a Senate which controlled Cyrenaica. The senate's members were representatives from the three groups and the king was the senatorial president. The new constitution, had reduced the powers, responsibilities and authority of the Cyrenaean King. The monarchy remained however, though the king was only responsible and only had the authority for to grant land to citizens and be chief priest, in charge of religious duties. Having set aside specific precincts and priesthoods for Battus, Demonax put in place Ephors to punish impostors and created an armed police force of 300 men to patrol and protect. Additionally, all else that had earlier belonged to the monarchs Demonax made public, placing it in the hands of the people. After completing the reforms, Demonax immediately left Cyrene.

== Legacy ==
Though Demonax's reforms continued in force throughout the reign of Battus III, the next king, Arcesilaus III, caused a great disturbance over his rights and titles. Arcesilaus, supported by his mother, the dowager Pheretime, demanded the return of his ancestral privileges, and in the ensuing strife was defeated and he fled to Samos. Arcesilaus gathered his forces, and was restored to his throne, before being assassinated and succeeded by his son, Battus IV, the Fair, who would submit to the Persians as a client king.

== Sources ==
- Histories, Herodotus of Halicarnassus, Book Four
- Moralia, Plutarch
