= Critola =

6th-century BC Greek princess of Cyrenaica

Critola (Ancient Greek: Κρίτολα, flourished 550 BC) was a Libyan Greek princess of Cyrenaica and its capital Cyrene and was a member of the Battiad dynasty.

She was the daughter of Arcesilaus I, the second king of Cyrenaica, while her mother is unknown. Her paternal grandfather was Battus I, the first king of Cyrene, and her brother Battus II would be future Cyrenaean king. Critola was the paternal aunt and mother-in-law of future Cyrenaean king Arcesilaus II.

Little is known about Critola. According to Plutarch, she was renowned for her great dignity and was highly respected by all citizens. Critola married a Greek Cyrenaean nobleman, however his name is unknown. Her first child was a son called Polyarchus and her youngest child was her only daughter called Eryxo. Plutarch states that Critola by her husband had other sons, however the historian does not mention their names. Eryxo would become a future Cyrenaean Queen and would be the mother of future Cyrenaean King Battus III.

Her husband around 550 BC was murdered by Learchus, a rival to her nephew Arcesilaus II. Critola's husband had died a short time before Eryxo and Polyarchus had plotted to kill Learchus, who also had murdered Arcesilaus II. After Learchus was murdered, her grandson Battus III was proclaimed king by Polyarchus.

Critola supported Polyarchus who travelled to apologise to Egyptian Pharaoh Amasis II in order to save Cyrenaica. Plutarch states that she still lived when Battus III (reigned 550 BC-530 BC) became king and also states then she was an old woman.

== Sources ==
- Dictionary of Greek and Roman Biography and Mythology: Abaeus-Dysponteus, edited by Sir William Smith
- Plutarch, Moralia, p531 Bravery of Women, (Part 2 of 2)
