= Xenodamus of Cythera =

Xenodamus of Cythera (Ancient Greek: Ξενόδαμος ὁ Κυθήριος), was an ancient Greek musician and lyric poet, known as one of the leading figures of the second school of music that developed at Sparta under the direction of Thaletas. According to Pseudo-Plutarch (On Music), this second musical movement also included Thaletas the Gortinean, Xenocritus the Locrian, Polymnestus the Colophonian, and Sacadas the Argive. These musicians introduced various musical festivals and exhibitions across Greece, such as the Gymnopaediae in Sparta, the Apodeixeis among the Arcadians, and the Endymatia in Argos.

Xenodamus and his contemporaries were chiefly known for composing paeans (songs of praise), though there was some debate about the nature of his works. Pratinas and other writers maintained that Xenodamus did not write paeans but rather hyporchemes (songs composed for dances.) Pseudo-Plutarch notes that one of Xenodamus's tunes was still extant in his time, and its style clearly identified it as a hyporcheme.

Athenaeus also mentions Xenodamus (but calls him Xenodemus (Ξενόδημος)), naming him alongside Pindar as one of the foremost composers of hyporchemes among the ancient lyric poets.
