= Archelaus (alchemist) =

Ancient Greek poet

Archelaus (Ancient Greek: Ἀρχέλαος) was the author of a poem consisting of upwards of three hundred Greek iambics, entitled Περὶ τῆς ῾Ιερᾶς Τέχνης (Perì tês Hierâs Tékhnēs, in Latin "De Sacra Arte").

Nothing is known of the events of his life; his date also is uncertain, but the poem is evidently the work of a comparatively recent writer, and must not be attributed to any of the older authors of this name.

This poem was published for the first time in the second volume of Julius Ludwig Ideler's Physici et Medici Graeci Minores in 1842; but a few extracts had previously been inserted by J. S. Bernard, in his edition of Palladius, De Febribus in 1745.
