= Thimbron =

Thimbron or Thibron (Greek: Θίμβρων) may refer to:

- Thimbron (fl. 400–391 BC), Lacedaemonian general in the Corinthian War
- Thimbron (fl. 324–322 BC), Lacedaemonian officer of Harpalus and leader of campaigns in Cyrenaica
