= Etearchus =

Ancient Cretan king

Etearchus was the King of the ancient Cretan city of Axus or Oaxos, flourishing in the early 7th century BC.

According to Herodotus, at one point Etearchus, influenced by the slanders of his second wife, believed that his orphaned daughter Phronime, from his first marriage, was leading a shameful life. He handed her over to Themison, a merchant from Thera (now known as Santorini), with a sworn promise to the gods that upon his return to Santorini, he would throw her from his ship into the sea.

Indeed, Themison took the young princess but, upon his return, did not want to kill her nor break his divine oath. Therefore, he tied her with a rope and threw her into the sea, then pulled her back onto his ship. Upon reaching his homeland, he presented her to Polymnestus, the ruler of Thera. Polymnestus, admiring her beauty, kept her with him and later married her. They had a son, Battus I or Battus, known in history as the founder of Cyrene and as the first Greek king in Africa, founder of a dynasty.

== Bibliography ==
- William Smith, Dictionary of Greek and Roman Geography (1854) LLD, Ed.
- Herodotus, The Histories. Book IV. A. D. Godley, Ed.
