= Thaletas =

Greek musician and lyric poet

Thaletas or Thales of Crete (Greek: Θαλῆς or Θαλήτας) was an early Greek musician and lyric poet.

== Biography ==
=== Historicity ===
The position of Thaletas is one of the most interesting, and at the same time most difficult points, in that most interesting and difficult subject, the early history of Greek music and poetry. The most certain fact known of him is that he introduced from Crete into Sparta certain principles or elements of music and rhythm, which did not exist in Terpander's system, and thereby founded the second of the musical schools which flourished at Sparta. He was a native of Crete, and, according to the best writers, of the city of Gortyna.

=== In Sparta ===
In compliance, according to tradition, with an invitation which the Spartans sent to him in obedience to an oracle, he removed to Sparta, where, by the sacred character of his paeans, and the humanizing influence of his music, he appeased the wrath of Apollo, who had visited the city with a plague, and composed the factions of the citizens, who were at enmity with each other. At Sparta he became the head of a new school (katastasis) of music, which appears never afterwards to have been supplanted, and the influence of which was maintained also by Xenodamus of Cythera, Xenocritus of Locris, Polymnestus of Colophon, and Sacadas of Argos.

How uncertain were the traditions followed by the generality of the ancient writers respecting the date of Thaletas is manifest from the statements of Suidas, that he lived before the time of Homer, of Demetrius Magnes, that he was "very ancient, about the time of Hesiod and Homer and Lycurgus," and of the many other writers, who make him contemporary with Lycurgus, and even an elder contemporary. In nearly all the accounts of the removal of Thaletas to Sparta, he is said to have gone thither at the invitation of Lycurgus, who used his influence to prepare the minds of the people for his own laws; while some even speak of him as if he were a legislator, from whom Lycurgus derived some of his laws. These accounts, which Aristotle condemns as anachronisms, can easily be explained.

The influence of music upon character and manners was in the opinion of the ancients so great, that it was quite natural to speak of Terpander and Thaletas as fellow-workers with the great legislator of the Spartans informing the character of the people. Moreover, in the case of Thaletas, the supposed connection with Lycurgus would assume a more probable appearance on account of his coming from Crete, from whence also Lycurgus was supposed to have derived so many of his institutions; and this is, in fact, the specific form which the tradition assumed, namely, that Lycurgus, arriving at Crete in the course of his travels, there met with Thaletas, who was one of the men renowned in the island for wisdom and political abilities and who, while professing to be a lyric poet, used his art as a pretext, but in fact devoted himself to political science in the same way as the ablest of legislators. Add to this the great probability that later writers mistook the sense of the word nomos in the ancient accounts of Thaletas; and his association with Lycurgus is explained. It is not worth while to discuss the statement of Jerome (Chron. s. a. 1266, b. c. 750), who says that Thales of Miletus (probably meaning Thales of Crete, for the philosopher's age is well known) lived in the reign of Romulus.

The strictly historical evidence respecting the date of Thaletas is contained in three testimonies. First, the statement of Glaucus, one of the highest authorities on the subject, that he was later than Archilochus. Secondly, the fact recorded by Pausanias, that Polymnestus composed verses in his praise for the Lacedaemonians, whence it is probable that he was an elder contemporary of Polymnestus, and therefore older than Alcman, by whom Polymnestus was mentioned. Thirdly, in his account of the second school or system (katastasis) of music at Sparta, Plutarch tells us that the first system was established by Terpander; but of the second the following had the best claim to be considered as the leaders, Thaletas, Xenodamus, Xenocritus, Polymnestus, and Sacadas; and that to them was ascribed the origin of the Gymnopaedias in Lacedaemon, of the Apodeixeis in Arcadia, and of the Endymatia in Argos. This important testimony is very probably derived from the work of Glaucus. Lastly, Plutarch mentions a vague tradition, which is on the face of it improbable, and which is quite unworthy to be placed by the side of the other three, that Thaletas derived the rhythm called Maron and the Cretic rhythm from the music of the Phrygian flute-player Olympus. The context shows that Plutarch here deserts his guide, Glaucus, and sets up against him the traditions of other writers, we know not whom.

From these testimonies we obtain the result that Thaletas was younger than Archilochus and Terpander, but older than Polymnestus and Alcman, that he was the first of the poets of the second Spartan school of music, by whose influence the great Dorian festivals which have been mentioned were either established, or, what is the more probable meaning, were systematically arranged in respect of the choruses which were performed at them.

== Legacy ==
The improvement effected in music by Thaletas appears to have consisted in the introduction into Sparta of that species of music and poetry which was associated with the religious rites of his native country; in which the calm and solemn worship of Apollo prevailed side by side with the more animated songs and dances of the Curetes, which resembled the Phrygian worship of the Magna Mater. His chief compositions were paeans and hyporchemes, which belonged respectively to these two kinds of worship. In connection with the paean he introduced the rhythm of the Cretic foot, with its resolutions in the paeons; and the Pyrrhic dance, with its several variations of rhythm, is also ascribed to him. He seems to have used both the lyre and the flute.

Plutarch and other writers speak of him as a lyric poet, and Suidas mentions, as his works, mele kai poiemata tina mythica, and it is pretty certain that the musical compositions of his age and school were often combined with suitable original poems, though sometimes, as we are expressly told of many of the names of Terpander, they were adapted to the verses of Homer. Be this as it may, we have now no remains of the poetry of Thaletas.

== Literature ==
- Zaykov, Andrey. Thaletas from Creta in Sparta. (in Russian + English Summary.) Published in: Issedon (ΙΣΣΗΔΟΝ): Almanac of Ancient History and Culture. Ekaterinburg, 2002. Vol. I.

== Sources ==
- Fabric. Bill. Graec. vol. i. pp. 295 – 297; Muller, Hist, of the Lit. of Anc. Greece, vol. i. pp. 159 – 161; Ulrici, Gesch. d. Hellen. Dichikunst^ vol. ii. pp. 212, foil., a very valuable account of Thaletas; Bernhardy, Geschichte der Griech. Lit. vol. i. pp. 267, 270, vol. ii. pp. 420, 421, 427.) Clinton does (F. //. vol. i. s. a. 644)
