= Themison of Thera =

Ancient Greek merchant

Themison (Ancient Greek: Θεμίσων) was a merchant of the island of Thera, who, according to the Cyrenaean accounts of the foundation of their city, was the instrument made use of by Etearchus, king of Axus, for the destruction of his daughter Phronime. Themison, however, evaded the fulfilment of the oath by which he had involuntarily bound himself to drown Phronime, and carried her in safety to Thera. (Herod, iv. 154.)
