= Christian Ludwig Ideler =

German chronologist and astronomer (1766–1846)

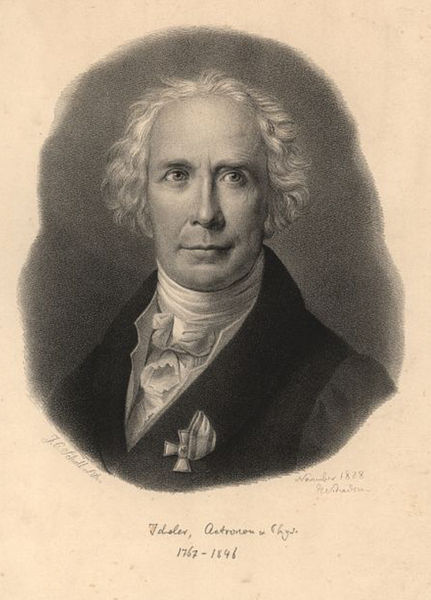
Christian Ludwig Ideler

Christian Ludwig Ideler (/ˈɪdələr/; German: [ˈiːdəlɐ]; 21 September 1766 – 10 August 1846) was a German chronologist and astronomer.

== Life ==
He was born in Gross-Brese near Perleberg. His earliest work was the editing in 1794 of an astronomical almanac for the Prussian government. He taught mathematics and mechanics in the school of woods and forests, and also in the military school. In 1821, he became professor at the University of Berlin, and in 1829 became a foreign member of the Institute of France. From 1816 to 1822, he was tutor to the young princes William Frederick and Charles. He died in Berlin on 10 August 1846.

== Works ==
He devoted his life chiefly to the examination of ancient systems of chronology. In 1825–1826 he published his great work, Handbuch der mathematischen und technischen Chronologie ("Handbook of mathematical and technical chronology," 2 vols.; 2nd ed., 1883), re-edited as Lehrbuch der Chronologie ("Textbook of chronology," 1831); a supplementary volume, Die Zeitrechnung der Chinesen ("The reckoning of time by the Chinese"), appeared in 1839 in Berlin.

He wrote also Historische Untersuchungen über die astronomischen Beobachtungen der Alten ("Historical investigations on the astronomical observations of the ancients," Leipzig, 1806), Untersuchungen über den Ursprung und die Bedeutung der Sternnamen ("Investigations on the origin and significance of the names of stars") and Über den Ursprung des Thierkreises ("Origins of the zodiac," 1838). With Nolte, he published handbooks on English and French language and literature.

His son, Julius Ludwig Ideler (1809–1842), wrote Meteorologia veterum Graecorum et Romanorum — Prolegomena ad novam Meteorologicorum Aristotelis — Editionem adornandam. (PhD thesis, 1832).

== Works ==
Scans of Ideler's works at Google Book Search:

- Handbuch der mathematischen und technischen Chronologie (Volume 1)
- Handbuch der mathematischen und technischen Chronologie (Volume 2)
- Lehrbuch der Chronologie
- Untersuchungen über den Ursprung und die Bedeutung der Sternnamen
