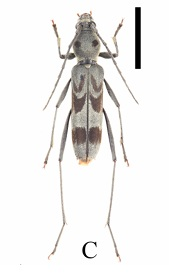

Scientific classification
- Domain: Eukaryota
- Kingdom: Animalia
- Phylum: Arthropoda
- Class: Insecta
- Order: Coleoptera
- Suborder: Polyphaga
- Infraorder: Cucujiformia
- Family: Cerambycidae
- Genus: Demonax
- Species: D. venosulus

Binomial name
- Demonax venosulus Holzschuh, 2006

= Demonax venosulus =

Species of beetle

Demonax venosulus is a species of beetle of the Cerambycidae family. This species is found in China (Sichuan).
