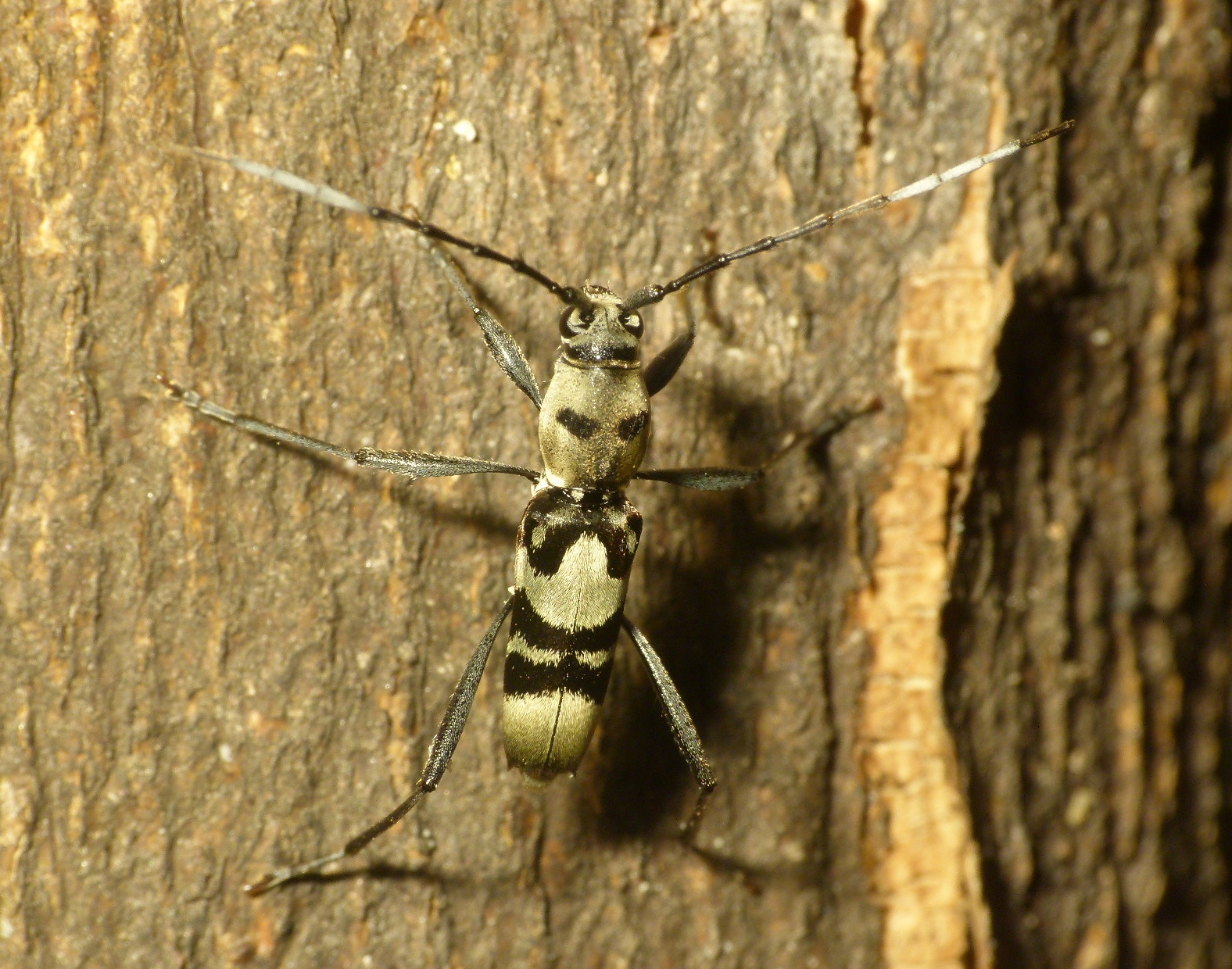

Scientific classification
- Domain: Eukaryota
- Kingdom: Animalia
- Phylum: Arthropoda
- Class: Insecta
- Order: Coleoptera
- Suborder: Polyphaga
- Infraorder: Cucujiformia
- Family: Cerambycidae
- Genus: Demonax
- Species: D. decorus

Binomial name
- Demonax decorus Gahan, 1906

= Demonax decorus =

Species of insect

Demonax decorus is a species of long-horned beetle found in southern India and Sri Lanka. It is about 1-1.5 cm long with black and yellowish-olive markings formed by fine pubescence.

These beetles are known to lay their eggs on the trunks of old trees especially of citrus in cultivation and forest trees like Litsea. The larvae are xylophagous.
