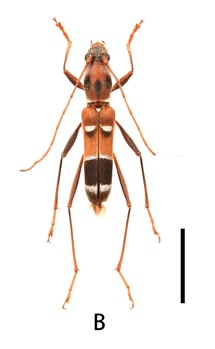

Scientific classification
- Domain: Eukaryota
- Kingdom: Animalia
- Phylum: Arthropoda
- Class: Insecta
- Order: Coleoptera
- Suborder: Polyphaga
- Infraorder: Cucujiformia
- Family: Cerambycidae
- Genus: Demonax
- Species: D. leucoscutellatus

Binomial name
- Demonax leucoscutellatus (Hope, 1831)

Synonyms
- Clytus leucoscutellatus; Rhaphuma semi-scutellata Chevrolat, 1863; Clytus (Caloclytus) castaneorufus Fairmaire, 1895; Demonax leucoscutellatus var. assamensis Plavilstshikov, 1927

= Demonax leucoscutellatus =

Species of beetle

Demonax leucoscutellatus is a species of beetle in the family Cerambycidae. This species is found in Nepal, India (Sikkim, Assam, Arunachal Pradesh, Manipur), Vietnam, China (Guangxi, Hong Hong, Yunnan).
