= Eryxo =

6th-century BC Greek queen of Cyrenaica

Eryxo (Ancient Greek: Ἐρυξώ; flourished 6th century BC) was a Greek woman, who was a Queen of Cyrenaica and was a member of The Battiads dynasty, the family that ruled Cyrenaica and Cyrene. From the ancient Greek sources, she appears to be the first Greek Cyrenaean Queen mentioned from the dynasty.

== Life ==
Eryxo was the only daughter and youngest child of Cyrenaean Princess Critola. Her father, a Cyrenaean noble whose name is unknown, was murdered in 550 BC by Learchus who became a rival to Cyrenaean King Arcesilaus II. Plutarch states her eldest brother was called Polyarchus and that she had other brothers, but does not give their names. Her maternal grandfather was the second Greek Cyrenaean King Arcesilaus I, however her maternal grandmother is unknown. Through her mother, she was a great granddaughter of the first Greek King and founder of Cyrene, Battus I.

=== Marital history ===
Before 560 BC, she married her maternal cousin Cyrenaean Prince Arcesilaus II, who was the son of her maternal uncle, Cyrenaean King Battus II. Eryxo and Arcesilaus had a son called Battus III. Plutarch describes her as a ‘noble, modest and courteous woman’.

== Succession ==
In 560 BC, Battus II died, and Eryxo's husband Arcesilaus II became the new king. Arcesilaus’ counsel was Learchus, who had murdered Eryxo's father. Learchus was secretly plotting against Arcesilaus to overthrow him. When Arcesilaus discovered that Learchus was plotting against him, he ordered Learchus and his supporters to be banished from Cyrene.

In turn Learchus, Arcesilaus and their supporters ended up in a power struggle which resulted with Learchus and his supporters defeating Arcesilaus and the Cyrenaean Army at Leucon. Learchus also poisoned and strangled Arcesilaus near Leucon and after his victory over Arcesilaus. Learchus returned to Cyrene in triumph in hope of becoming king.

Learchus became King under the false pretence that was protecting Battus III, although by then Battus was a young man. Learchus pretended to be Eryxo's humble servant, in hope that he could marry Eryxo, and ultimately become co-ruler with Battus III.

Eryxo, taking counsel with her brothers, decided to give Learchus the impression she was willing to marry him. She sent her maid to Learchus, telling him to come her at night.

Learchus was overjoyed, and came at the time appointed. Eryxo and her brother, Polyarchus, were plotting to kill Learchus in revenge for the deaths of their father and Arcesilaus. Polyarchus, with two young men, had swords in their hands were secretly hiding in Eryxo's bedroom.

=== Demise of Learchus ===
Learchus came unattended to Eryxo's room. As he entered, the young men fell upon Learchus and ran their swords through his body, killing him. Learchus’ body was thrown over the wall, and Polyarchus brought out Battus III, proclaiming him the king. Battus III reigned 550 BC-530 BC.

=== Reign of Battus III ===
When Battus III was proclaimed King, soldiers that served the Egyptian Pharaoh Amasis II were present. Amasis had been an ally to Learchus, and, to avenge his ally's death, planned to declare war on the Cyrenaeans. At this same time, the mother of Amasis died, and Amasis was preparing her funeral; Polyarchus decided to travel to Egypt to give his condolences to Amasis. Eryxo and Critola would not allow Polyarchus to travel alone, and they travelled with him, in hopes of to saving Cyrenaica.

When the three reached the court of the Egyptian Pharaoh and gave their condolences, others admired them for the purpose of their travel. Amasis did little to applaud the chastity and fortitude of the three, so he honored Polyarchus’ mother and sister with presents and royal attendance which Amasis had sent the three back to Cyrene. Amasis withdrew his soldiers from Cyrenaica. The fate of Eryxo's afterwards is unknown.
