= Palladius (physician) =

6th century Greek medical writer

Palladius (Greek: Παλλάδιος; c. 6th century) was a Greek medical writer, some of whose works are still extant. Nothing is known of the events of his life, but, as he is commonly called Iatrosophistes, he is supposed to have gained that title by having been a professor of medicine at Alexandria. His date is uncertain; he may have lived in the 6th or 7th centuries. All that can be pronounced with certainty is that he quotes Galen and is himself quoted by Rhazes. Three of his works are extant:

- Commentary on Hippocrates' On fractures
- Commentary on book VI of Hippocrates' Epidemics
- Commentary on Galen's On the Sects

His Commentaries on Hippocrates are considerably abridged from Galen; they appear to have been known to the Arabic writers. They have both of them come down to us imperfect.
