= Quiriacus of Ostia =

Italian Roman Catholic saint

Saint Quiriacus

Martyr and Bishop of Ostia
- Died: 235
- Venerated in: Roman Catholic Church
- Canonized: Pre-congregation
- Feast: 23 August

Quiriacus was Bishop of Ostia, and suffered martyrdom during the reign of Emperor Severus Alexander. Quiriacus was martyred along with Maximus, his priest, and Archelaus, a deacon.
