= Learchus (regicide) =

King of Cyrenaica in 550 BC

King of Cyrenaica
- Reign: 550 BC
- Predecessor: Arcesilaus II
- Successor: Battus III
- Died: 550 BC; Cyrene
- Religion: Greek polytheism

Learchus (Greek: Λέαρχος) was an adviser in the government of the Kingdom of Cyrenaica during the reign of king Arcesilaus II in the sixth century BCE and is best known for the murder of this king.

== Early life ==
Little is known about Learchus, besides what is written in Plutarch's Moralia and the Histories by Herodotus, who mentions him in passing. Learchus appears to have been an early acquaintance of murder, having killed a Cyrenaean noble who was the husband of the Princess Critola and father of Queen Eryxo.

== Rise to power ==
When Battus II of Cyrene died, his son Arcesilaus II ascended the throne, along with his queen, Eryxo. Arcesilaus appointed Learchus as his advisor. Herodotus states that Learchus was his brother, but Plutarch contradicts him in saying that Learchus was an ill-mannered and vicious friend. A further contradiction is presented in that Herodotus speaks of the activities of Learchus as the activities of the "brothers of Arcesilaus" and does not mention Learchus by name until he is identified as the regicide of Arcesilaus. Arcesilaus followed the counsels of Learchus and became increasingly tyrannical. It is in this manner that Arcesilaus gained the epithet "the Oppressor." During this time, Learchus was secretly plotting to overthrow Arcesilaus and become Cyrenaica's new king, and he manipulated Arcesilaus into ordering the banishment or death of many Cyrenaean nobles.

== Exile ==
When Arcesilaus found out about Learchus’ plotting, they quarrelled over the kingship and Learchus falsely blamed all misdoing on the king. Arcesilaus then ordered Learchus and his supporters to be exiled from Cyrenaica.

Learchus and his supporters left the city of Cyrene and created their own settlement called Barca (sometimes known as Meri, Libya). During the construction of Barca, Learchus was able to persuade local Libyans to withdraw their allegiance from Cyrene and encourage them to come with him and to declare war on Arcesilaus. The Libyans were already disgruntled at having been cut off from a large part of their lands. Thus, Learchus gained an army.

== Battle with Arcesilaus ==
News of Learchus and his army preceded them and reached the ears of Arcesilaus, who gathered his forces and marched to meet their opponents. Learchus and the local Libyans were alarmed at the Cyrenaean troops approaching them and hastily withdrew. Arcesilaus and the Cyrenaean troops chased Learchus and his supporters across the country into eastern Libya unto a site called Leucon, the location of which is unknown. Then Learchus and his supporters decided to attack the king and his army. Arcesilaus and the Cyrenaean troops were defeated and lost up to 7,000 soldiers.

== Regicide ==
After the defeat, Arcesillaus fell sick. During this time, Learchus strangled him, aiming to take control of the throne.

== Return and death ==
Learchus, as pretender to the throne, claimed he was protecting Battus III, although by then Battus was a young man. Learchus was pretending to be Queen Eryxo's humble servant, treating Battus and Eryxo in dignity, in hope that Eryxo would marry him. Learchus also promised that he would subsequently make Battus III his co-ruler.

Eryxo was taking counsel with her brothers and in the end asked to see Learchus and gave the impression that she wished to marry him. She sent her maid to Learchus who stated the same to him, the instructions being to come to her at night to perform the ceremony.

Learchus was overjoyed by the news that Eryxo wanted to marry him and Learchus came over when Eryxo was ready. This was when it was revealed that Eryxo and her brother, Polyarchus were plotting to kill Learchus in revenge for the deaths of their father, the Cyrenaean noble, and King Arcesilaus. Polyarchus and two other conspirators kept swords ready, waiting and hiding in Eryxo's bedroom.

Eryxo had asked Learchus to come to her bedroom, which he did, unattended. As Learchus entered, the young men fell upon him and ran their swords through his body, killing him. Learchus’ body was thrown over the wall. Polyarchus then brought out Battus III and proclaimed him the king of Cyrenaica. Battus reigned from 550 BC to 530 BC.

== Legacy ==
When Battus was proclaimed King, soldiers that served the Egyptian Pharaoh Amasis II were present. When they reported back to Amasis, the Pharaoh employed the excuse that he was an ally to the late Learchus to attack Cyrenaica, thus "avenging" the death of Learchus. However, though Amasis wanted to declare war on the Cyrenaeans, it was at this time that the mother of Amasis, a certain Tashereniset died, and Amasis became preoccupied in preparing for her funeral. Polyarchus decided to travel to Egypt to state his condolences to Amasis. Eryxo and Critola, feared for his life, and wouldn't allow Polyarchus to travel alone, finally journeying with him. During the reign of Battus III, Battus realized the instability of his kingdom and brought in a lawgiver named Demonax to reform the government. Demonax's reforms were disregarded by the successor to Battus, Arcesilaus III, who instigated yet another period of civil strife. On the deaths of Amasis II and Arcesilaus III, both states went under the thumb of Persian rule.
