= Archelaus (bishop of Caesarea) =

Archelaus (Ancient Greek: Ἀρχέλαος) was bishop of Caesarea in Cappadocia around the 5th century CE.

== Works ==
Archelaus wrote a work against the heresy of the Messalians -- that is, the sect called the Euchites -- which is referred to by Photius. Scholar William Cave places his time around 440 CE.

== See also ==
- List of Christian heresies
