= Arcesilaus IV of Cyrene =

King of Cyrenaica from 465 to 440 BC

King of Cyrenaica
- Reign: 465-440 BC
- Predecessor: Battus IV
- Successor: Monarchy abolished
- Born: Cyrene
- Died: 440 BC; Cyrene
- Issue: Battus V
- Father: Battus IV
- Religion: Greek polytheism

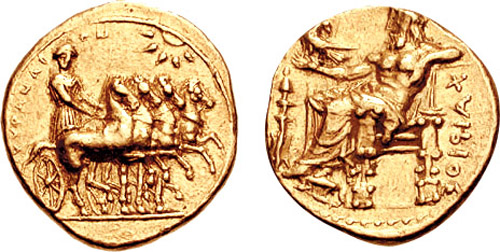

Arcesilaus IV of Cyrene (Greek: Ἀρκεσίλαος, flourished 5th century BC) was the eighth King of Cyrene and last king of the Battiad dynasty. He served as a client king under Persian authority.

== Biography ==
Arcesilaus was the only child of the seventh Cyrenaean king, Battus IV. When his father died in 465 BC Arcesilaus became the new king. In 462 BC, Arcesilaus won a chariot race at the Pythian Games at Delphi using native Libyan horses. His victory was celebrated by Greek poet Pindar in the Fourth and Fifth Pythian Odes. Pindar advises Arcesilaus in his ode to reconcile with his opponents and stresses the legitimacy of his rule because his family has ruled in Cyrenaica for eight generations.

His reign grew progressively more tyrannical, exiling many Cyrenaean nobles and bringing in mercenaries to support his rule. As a result of his actions, the Cyrenaeans rebelled, forcing Arcesilaus to leave Cyrene and flee to Euesperides (modern Benghazi) with his son and only child, Battus V.

Arcesilaus, along with his son, were killed by the Cyrenaean citizens in 440 BC. It is said that after Battus was killed, the Cyrenaeans cut off his head and threw his head into the sea. With Battus’ beheading, Battiad rule in Cyrenaica ended and the citizens proclaimed Cyrenaica a narrow democracy.

== See also ==
- List of Kings of Cyrene

== Sources ==
- Herodotus, The Histories, Book 4
- Burn, A R. The Penguin History of Greece, Penguin Books, Clay Ltd, St Ives P/C, England, 1990.
- Pindar's odes to Arcesilaus
- Smith dictionary
- https://www.livius.org/ct-cz/cyrenaica/cyrenaica.html
- http://www.mediterranees.net/dictionnaires/smith/cyrene.html
- https://web.archive.org/web/20070805144946/http://ancientworlds.net/aw/Article/762227
- Hornblower, S. (2011). The Greek World: 479-323 BCE. Routledge. New York.

Arcesilaus IV of Cyrene Battiad dynasty Died: 440 BC
Regnal titles
Preceded by Battus IV	King of Cyrene; 465 BC – 440 BC	Vacant Republic under Persia Title next held by Magas
