= Thibron (mercenary commander, died 322 BC) =

Spartan mercenary commander

Thibron (Ancient Greek: Θίβρων; died 322 BC) was a Lacedaemonian who was a confidential officer of Harpalus, the Macedonian satrap of Babylon under Alexander the Great.

According to one account it was Thibron who murdered Harpalus in Crete, in 324 BC. He then possessed himself of his late master's treasures, fleet, and army, and, ostensibly espousing the cause of some Cyrenaean exiles, sailed to Cyrene with the intention of subjugating it. He defeated the Cyrenaeans in a battle, obtained possession of their harbour, Apollonia, together with the treasures he found there, and compelled them to capitulate on condition of paying him 500 talents, and supplying him with half of their war-chariots for his expeditions. This agreement, however, they were soon induced to repudiate by Mnasicles, one of Thibron's officers, who had deserted his standard, and gone over to the enemy. Although Thibron was aided by the Barcaeans and Hesperians, and succeeded in taking the town of Taucheira, under the able direction of Mnasicles, the Cyrenaeans recovered Apollonia. Thibron's fortunes were further dealt a heavy blow when his fleet was almost totally destroyed in a storm with heavy loss of men.

Undeterred, he collected reinforcements from the Peloponnese, defeated the Cyrenaeans (who were now aided by the Libyans and Carthaginians), and closely besieged Cyrene. Pressed by scarcity, the citizens quarrelled among themselves. The chiefs of the oligarchical party were driven out from the city, and betook themselves partly to Ptolemy I Soter, king of Egypt, and partly to Thibron. Ptolemy thereupon sent a large force against Cyrene under Ophellas. The exiles who had taken refuge with Thibron, endeavoured to escape and join Ophellas, but were detected and put to death. The Cyrenaean people then made common cause with Thibron against the new invader; but Ophellas defeated him. Thibron was forced to flee, but fell into the hands of some Libyans, who delivered him to Epicydes, an Olynthian whom Ophellas, having taken Taucheira, had made governor of the town. The citizens of Taucheira, with the sanction of Ophellas, sent Thibron to Apollonia, where he was crucified in 322 BC.

== Bibliography ==
- Bosworth, Albert Brian (2016). "Thibron (2), Spartan mercenary commander, d. 322 BCE". In Oxford Classical Dictionary. Accessed 28 January 2022.
