= Archelaus (son of Androcles) =

In 326 BC, Archelaus held the position of Macedonian phrourarch, responsible for overseeing the defense and security of the Bactrian stronghold known as Aornos.
