= Battus IV of Cyrene =

Greek king of Cyrene from 515 BC to 465 BC

King of Cyrene
- Reign: 515-465 BC
- Predecessor: Arcesilaus III
- Successor: Arcesilaus IV
- Born: Cyrene
- Died: 465 BC; Cyrene
- Issue: Arcesilaus IV
- Father: Arcesilaus III
- Religion: Greek polytheism

Battus IV of Cyrene surnamed The Handsome or The Fair (Greek: Βάττος ο Καλός, ruled 515 BC - 465 BC) was the seventh and second to last Greek king of Cyrenaica of the Battiad dynasty. He was the first Cyrenaean king to rule as a client king under the Persian Empire.

== Ancestry ==
Battus was the son and only child of the fifth Cyrenaean king, Arcesilaus III. His mother was the daughter of Alazir, a Libyan who served as governor of Barca. Herodotus states that his father and his maternal grandfather were related and his maternal grandmother is unknown.

== Reign ==
Battus succeeded his paternal grandmother Pheretima in late 515 BC. She had died from a skin disease in Egypt. From 515 BC until 465 BC, Battus ruled as king of Cyrenaica. Very little is known about his reign although it seems that his reign was peaceful. During his reign, Cyrenaica exported wheat, barley, olive oil and silphium (a now extinct plant that had aromatic & medicinal properties). He was succeeded by his son Arcesilaus IV and was buried near his paternal ancestors.

== See also ==
- List of Kings of Cyrene
- Silphium

== Sources ==
- Herodotus, The Histories, Book 4
- Smith, W, Dictionary of Greek and Roman Biography and Mythology, Volume 1
- https://www.livius.org/ct-cz/cyrenaica/cyrenaica.html
- http://www.mediterranees.net/dictionnaires/smith/cyrene.html

Battus IV of Cyrene Battiad dynasty Died: 465 BC
Regnal titles
Preceded by Arcesilaus III	King of Cyrene; 515 BC – 465 BC	Succeeded by Arcesilaus IV
