= Battiadae =

Dynasty of ancient rulers of Cyrene

The Battiadae or Battiads (Greek: Βαττιάδαι), were the ruling dynasty of the Greek city-state of Cyrene, in modern Libya. Battus I, who founded Cyrene in 631 BC, was also the founder of the dynasty. The Battiads were overthrown in 440 BC.

== List of members ==
- Battus I (c. 631–600 BC), founder of Cyrene.
- Arcesilaus I (c. 600–583 BC), son of Battus I.
- Battus II "the Blessed" (c. 583–560 BC), son of Arcesilaus I.
- Critola, sister of Battus II and mother of Eryxo and Polyarchus.
- Arcesilaus II "the Cruel" (c. 560–550 BC), son of Battus II.
- Perseus, younger brother of Arcesilaus II, he rebelled against him and left Cyrene to found Barke in c.560 with three other brothers.
- Zacynthius, younger brother of Arcesilaus II, he rebelled against him and left Cyrene to found Barke in c.560 with three other brothers.
- Aristomedon, younger brother of Arcesilaus II, he rebelled against him and left Cyrene to found Barke in c.560 with three other brothers.
- Lycus, younger brother of Arcesilaus II, he rebelled against him and left Cyrene to found Barke in c.560 with three other brothers.
- Learchus, younger brother of Arcesilaus II. Unlike his other brothers, he remained in Cyrene, but murdered Arcesilaus II and ruled as regent. He was murdered by Eryxo, Arcesilaus II's widow. According to Plutarch, he was only a friend of Arcesilaus II.
- Eryxo, wife of Arcesilaus II, she murdered Learchus.
- Polyarchus, brother of Eryxo, helped murder Learchus.
- Battus III "the Lame" (c. 550–530 BC). During his reign, most of the royal prerogatives were transferred to citizens by the reformer Demonax of Mantinea.
- Pheretima, wife of Battus III, mother of Arcesilaus III and Ladice.
- Arcesilaus III (c. 530–515 BC), son of Battus III and Pheretima.
- Ladice, daughter of Battus III and Pheretima, married Amasis II.
- Battus IV (c. 515–465 BC)
- Arcesilaus IV (c. 465–440 BC)

A famous descendant of Battus and thus one of the Battiadae was Callimachus, the Greek poet whose style was a chief inspiration for the Latin Neoteroi.

== Bibliography ==
- David Asheri, Alan Lloyd, Aldo Corcella, A Commentary on Herodotus Books I-IV, Oxford University Press, 2007. ISBN 9780198149569
