= Battus II of Cyrene =

6th-century BC king of Cyrenaica

King of Cyrenaica
- Reign: 583-560 BC
- Predecessor: Arcesilaus I
- Successor: Arcesilaus II
- Born: Cyrene
- Died: 560 BC; Cyrene
- Issue: Arcesilaus II
- House: Battiadae
- Father: Arcesilaus I
- Religion: Greek polytheism

Battus II of Cyrene, sometimes called Eudaimon (the Blessed) or the Latin equivalent Felix, (Greek: Βάττος ὁ Εὐδαίμων; ruled from c. 583 BC to 560 BC) was the third Greek king of Cyrenaica and Cyrene and a member of the Battiad dynasty.

== Ancestry ==
Battus II was the son of the second Cyrenaean king Arcesilaus I and an unknown mother. His paternal grandfather was Battus I, founder of the Greek colony in Libya. Battus II's sister was the princess Critola and was the maternal aunt to Arcesilaus II. She was also mother to Polyarchus and the future Cyrenaean Queen Eryxo. Eryxo would later marry Battus II's son, Arcesilaus II.

== Battle of the Well of Thaetis ==
Battus II encouraged further Greek settlement in his state, especially from the Peloponnese and Crete. This sparked conflict with the indigenous Libyans, whose king Adicran dispatched an embassy to the Egyptian Pharaoh Apries. Around 570 BC, Apries launched a military expedition against Cyrene. Battus and the Cyrenaeans met the Egyptians at the Well of Thestis in Irasa and defeated the Egyptian army. Herodotus states that the Egyptians had no warfare experience against the Greeks and they didn't take this battle seriously. Herodotus also states that this was the first battle that the Greeks and Egyptians ever fought against each other.

The victory at The Well of Thestis confirmed the sovereignty of Cyrene and the establishment of Cyrenaica. Battus went on to make an alliance with the new Egyptian Pharaoh Amasis II.

== Death ==
Plutarch considered Battus to be a worthy and honourable man. Battus died in 560 BC and was buried near his father and paternal grandfather. Battus II was succeeded by his son Arcesilaus II .

== See also ==
- List of Kings of Cyrene

== Sources ==
- Herodotus, The Histories, Book 4.
- Morkot, R., The Penguin Historical Atlas of Ancient Greece, Penguin Books, The Bath Press - Avon, Great Britain, 1996.
- Burn, A R. The Penguin History Greece, Penguin Books, Clay Ltd, St Ives P/C, England, 1990.
- Dictionary of Greek and Roman Biography and Mythology: Abaeus-Dysponteus, edited by Sir William Smith
- Cyrenaica in Livius.org
- "Cyrene" in A Dictionary of Greek and Roman Geography, by William Smith (1873)
- Plutarch's Virtues of Women

Battus II of Cyrene Battiad dynasty Died: 560 BC
Regnal titles
| Preceded by Arcesilaus I | King of Cyrene; 583 BC – 560 BC | Succeeded by Arcesilaus II |
