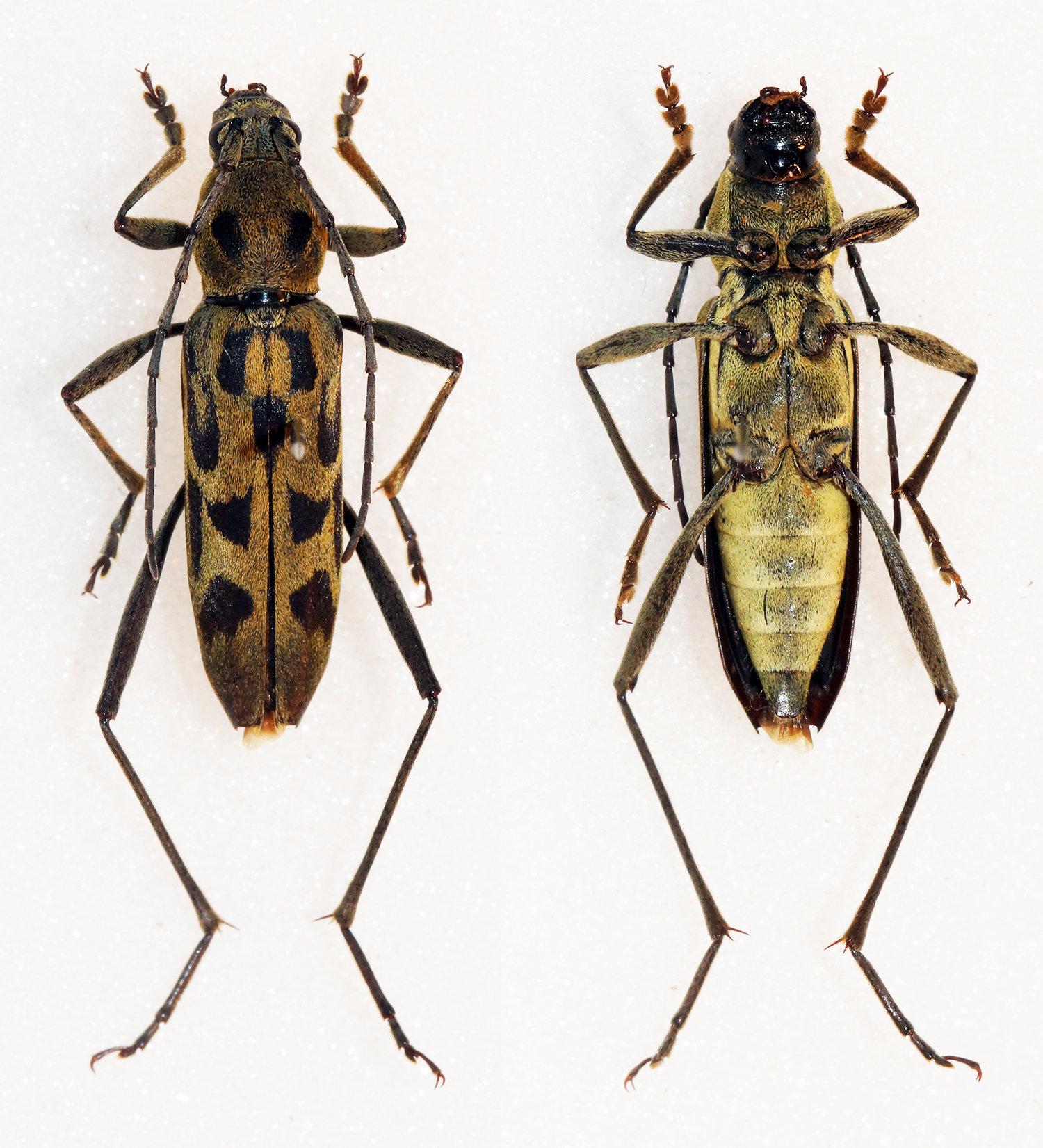
- Demonax notabilis

Scientific classification
- Domain: Eukaryota
- Kingdom: Animalia
- Phylum: Arthropoda
- Class: Insecta
- Order: Coleoptera
- Suborder: Polyphaga
- Infraorder: Cucujiformia
- Family: Cerambycidae
- Tribe: Clytini
- Genus: Demonax; Thomson, 1860

Type species
- Demonax nigrofasciatus

= Demonax (beetle) =

Genus of beetles

Demonax is a genus of the family of the longhorn beetles (Cerambycidae), containing the following species groups and species:

== Species groups ==
- species group semiluctuosus
- species group albicinctus
- species group vethi
- species group polyzonus
- species group algebraicus
- species group maximus
- species group mulio
- species group protogenes
- species group lineatus
- species group laticollis
- species group notabilis
- species group mustela
- species group macilentus

== Species ==
Species in the genus include:

- Demonax acutipennis Dauber, 2006
- Demonax albomaculatus (Allard, 1894)
- Demonax albotrifasciatus Pic, 1925
- Demonax amandus Holzschuh, 1991
- Demonax andamanicus Gahan, 1906
- Demonax annulicornis (Chevrolat, 1863)
- Demonax apicalis Pascoe, 1869
- Demonax ascendens (Pascoe, 1859)
- Demonax bakeri Aurivillius, 1922
- Demonax balyi (Pascoe, 1859)
- Demonax bimaculicollis (Schwarzer, 1925)
- Demonax blairi Gardiner, 1940
- Demonax brevelineatus Pic, 1925
- Demonax brevespinosus Pic, 1926
- Demonax buteae Gardner, 1940
- Demonax celebensis Aurivillius, 1922
- Demonax christinae Holzschuh, 1983
- Demonax chrysoderes (White, 1855)
- Demonax cinereus Dauber, 2002
- Demonax confidens Holzschuh, 1993
- Demonax contaminatus Holzschuh, 2003
- Demonax contrarius Holzschuh, 1991
- Demonax culicinus Pascoe, 1869
- Demonax damalis Pascoe, 1869
- Demonax decens Gahan, 1906
- Demonax decorus Gahan, 1906
- Demonax delectus Gahan, 1907
- Demonax delesserti Chevrolat, 1863
- Demonax divisus Chevrolat, 1863
- Demonax dohertii Gahan, 1906
- Demonax dolosus Holzschuh, 1991
- Demonax donaubaueri Holzschuh, 1996
- Demonax dorotheae Holzschuh, 1983
- Demonax flavofasciatus Dauber, 2002
- Demonax formicoides (Lameere, 1890)
- Demonax formosomontanus Ikeda & Niisato, 1984
- Demonax fortis Holzschuh, 2003
- Demonax fryanus Gahan, 1906
- Demonax funebris (Lameere, 1890)
- Demonax fungongensis Guo & Chen, 2005
- Demonax furcathorax
- Demonax gertrudae Holzschuh, 1983
- Demonax granulicollis (Hayashi, 1974)
- Demonax gregalis Gahan, 1907
- Demonax grewicola Holzschuh, 2017
- Demonax gunjii Holzschuh, 1983
- Demonax himalayanus (Pic, 1912)
- Demonax humerovittatus Dauber, 2003
- Demonax imitatus Holzschuh, 1991
- Demonax incanus (Newman, 1842)
- Demonax ingridae Holzschuh, 1983
- Demonax iniquus Holzschuh, 1993
- Demonax inops Holzschuh, 1991
- Demonax inscutellaris Pic, 1937
- Demonax insuetus Holzschuh, 1991
- Demonax jamesi Holzschuh, 1986
- Demonax javanicus Fisher, 1936
- Demonax jeanvoinei Pic, 1927
- Demonax jendeki Holzschuh, 1995
- Demonax jezoensis Matsushita & Tamanuki, 1935
- Demonax jimmiensis Gressitt, 1959
- Demonax josefinae Holzschuh, 1983
- Demonax kalabi Holzschuh, 1998
- Demonax kanoi (Hayashi, 1963)
- Demonax katarinae Holzschuh, 1983
- Demonax kejvali Holzschuh, 2017
- Demonax kezukai Holzschuh, 1984
- Demonax kheoae Gressitt & Rondon, 1970
- Demonax kostali Holzschuh, 2003
- Demonax languidus Holzschuh, 1992
- Demonax leucophaeus Holzschuh, 1993
- Demonax leucoscutellatus (Hope, 1831)
- Demonax levipes Holzschuh, 1991
- Demonax lineola Chevrolat, 1863
- Demonax lineolatus Redtenbacher, 1868
- Demonax luteicollis Gressitt, 1959
- Demonax macilentoides Dauber, 2003
- Demonax maculicollis Gahan, 1906
- Demonax mariae Holzschuh, 1983
- Demonax marketae Viktora, 2014
- Demonax martes Pascoe, 1869
- Demonax masaoi Niisato, 1984
- Demonax masatakai Ohbayashi, 1964
- Demonax mendicus Holzschuh, 1991
- Demonax merinjakensis
- Demonax murudensis
- Demonax narayani Holzschuh, 1984
- Demonax nawatai Hayashi, 1975
- Demonax nishiyamai Niisato, 1984
- Demonax niveofasciatus Viktora, 2014
- Demonax notator (Pascoe, 1869)
- Demonax nothus Holzschuh, 1991
- Demonax octavus Aurivillius, 1922
- Demonax offensus Holzschuh, 1992
- Demonax olemehli Holzschuh, 1989
- Demonax ovicollis (Fairmaire, 1895)
- Demonax parallelus Aurivillius, 1922
- Demonax parilis Holzschuh, 1995
- Demonax pendleburyi Fisher, 1935
- Demonax perdubius Holzschuh, 1993
- Demonax perspicuus Holzschuh, 1992
- Demonax piliger Holzschuh, 1992
- Demonax planatoides Dauber, 2006
- Demonax planatus Pascoe, 1869
- Demonax planicollis Holzschuh, 1991
- Demonax proximus Holzschuh, 1991
- Demonax pseudopsilomerus Gressitt & Rondon, 1970
- Demonax pudicus (Newman, 1842)
- Demonax puerilis Holzschuh, 1991
- Demonax pumilio Holzschuh, 1991
- Demonax quadricollis Gahan, 1906
- Demonax quadricolor Gahan, 1894
- Demonax ravus Holzschuh, 1992
- Demonax recurvus Aurivillius, 1923
- Demonax reductispinosus Gressitt, 1942
- Demonax reticulatus (Jordan, 1894)
- Demonax rollei Pic, 1943
- Demonax rosae Holzschuh, 1983
- Demonax rouyeri Pic, 1925
- Demonax rufus Guo & Chen, 2005
- Demonax sabinae Holzschuh, 1983
- Demonax saltarius Pascoe, 1869
- Demonax salvazai Pic, 1923
- Demonax sausai Holzschuh, 1995
- Demonax sawaii Ikeda, 1990
- Demonax seoulensis Mitono & Cho, 1942
- Demonax shuti Dauber, 2006
- Demonax siccus Holzschuh, 1991
- Demonax simulatus Dauber, 2003
- Demonax sospitalis Pascoe, 1869
- Demonax spinicornis (Newman, 1850)
- Demonax stabilis Holzschuh, 2003
- Demonax stigma Holzschuh, 1991
- Demonax strangaliomimus Heller, 1926
- Demonax subai Holzschuh, 1989
- Demonax submaculatus (Hayashi, 1974)
- Demonax sulinensis Niisato, 1984
- Demonax tectus Holzschuh, 1991
- Demonax tener Holzschuh, 2003
- Demonax tenuiculus Holzschuh, 1991
- Demonax tenuispinosus Pascoe, 1869
- Demonax testaceus (Hope, 1831)
- Demonax tibiellus Holzschuh, 1991
- Demonax tipularius Pascoe, 1869
- Demonax transversalis Aurivillius, 1910
- Demonax traudae Holzschuh, 1983
- Demonax triguttatus Aurivillius, 1928
- Demonax trivittatus Aurivillius, 1922
- Demonax trudae Holzschuh, 1983
- Demonax unicolor Aurivillius, 1923
- Demonax uniformis Pic, 1925
- Demonax vilis Holzschuh, 1991
- Demonax virescens Aurivillius, 1928
- Demonax walkeri (Pascoe, 1859)
- Demonax x-signatus Pic, 1943
- Demonax viduatus Holzschuh, 2009
- Demonax interruptus Pascoe, 1869
- Demonax curvofasciatus (Gressitt, 1939)
- Demonax palliatus Pascoe, 1869
- Demonax annamensis Pic, 1943
- Demonax aureicollis (Blanchard, 1853)
- Demonax diversefasciatus Pic, 1920
- Demonax fochi Pic, 1918
- Demonax marnei Pic, 1918
- Demonax proculscuti Li, Tian & Chen, 2013
- Demonax venosulus Holzschuh, 2006
- Demonax arcuatus Matsushita, 1939
- Demonax erythrops (Chevrolat, 1863)
