= Julius Ludwig Ideler =

German philologist and naturalist

Julius Ludwig Ideler (3 September 1809, in Berlin – 17 July 1842, in Berlin) was a German philologist and naturalist. He was the son of astronomer Christian Ludwig Ideler.

From 1828 he studied medicine, mathematics and natural sciences at the University of Berlin, where in 1834 he obtained his habilitation for language research. He died on 17 July 1842 in Berlin, age 32.

He was the author of books on ancient and modern languages and literature as well as on works involving natural sciences, being especially known for his studies of classical Greek and Roman meteorology.

== Selected works ==
- Handbuch der französischen sprache und literatur (4 volumes, 1826–35; with Johann Wilhelm Heinrich Nolte) – Handbook of French language and literature.
- Meteorologia veterum Graecorum et Romanorum — Prolegomena ad novam Meteorologicorum Aristotelis — Editionem adornandam, 1832.
- Ueber den Ursprung der Feuerkugeln und des Nordlichts, 1832 – On the origin of fireballs and the Northern Lights.
- Untersuchungen über den Hagel und die elektrischen Erscheinungen in unserer Atmosphäre, 1833 – Studies of hail and electrical phenomena in the atmosphere.
- Aristotelous Meteōrologika : Aristotelis Meteorologicorum libri IV (edition of Aristotle; 2 volumes, 1834–36).
- Die sage von dem schuss des Tell; eine historisch-kritische abhandlung, 1836.
- Kritische untersuchungen über die historische entwickelung der geographischen kenntnisse von der Neuen welt und die fortschritte der nautischen astronomie in dem 15ten und 16ten jahrhundert (3 volumes, 1836–52; by Alexander von Humboldt); volume 3, new edition; translation of Examen critique de l'histoire de la géographie du Nouveau continent 1. ptie., 4. section" of Voyage de Humboldt et Bonpland.
- Psalterium coptice, 1837.
- Leben und Wandel Karls des Grossen, beschrieben von Einhard. Einleitung, Urschrift, Erläuterung, Urkundensammlung (edition of Einhard; 2 volumes, 1839) – Life and actions of Charlemagne.
- Hermapion; sive, Rudimenta hieroglyphicae veterum Aegyptiorum literaturae, 1841.
- Physici et medici Graeci minores (2 volumes, 1841–42).
- Namen- und Sach-Verzeichniss zu Carl Ritter's Erdkunde von Asien (as editor; 3 volumes, 1841–49) – List of names and articles in Carl Ritter's geography of Asia.
