= List of kings of Cyrene =

Cyrene or Cyrenaica was a Greek colony on the North African coast, in what is now northeastern Libya, founded by Dorian settlers from Thera (modern Santorini) in the 7th century BC. Kings of Cyrene received a recurring posthumous hero cult like that of the Dorian kings of Sparta.

== Kings of Cyrene (Battiad dynasty), 632–440 BC ==
- Battus I 630–600 BC
- Arcesilaus I 600–583 BC
- Battus II 583–560 BC
- Arcesilaus II 560–550 BC
- Learchus 550 BC (disputed)
- Battus III 550–530 BC
- Arcesilaus III 530–515 BC
- Battus IV 515–465 BC
- Arcesilaus IV 465–440 BC

In 440 BC, Cyrene became a republic, under Persian suzerainty (as had been the latter kings from Arcesilaus III). Cyrene was conquered by Alexander the Great in 331 BC and fell to the portion of Ptolemy I in the division of Alexander's empire. In 276 BC it reasserted its independence.

== Kings of Cyrene, 276–246 BC ==
- Magas 276–250 BC
- Berenice II (Queen) 258–246 BC; alongside Magas and then Demetrius; contested by a Koinon
- Demetrius the Fair 250–249 BC
- Koinon 249–246 BC

In 249 BC Cyrene again became a republic, but was restored to Ptolemaic control in 246 BC by Ptolemy III who married to Berenice II, Queen of Cyrene. From 163 BC, Cyrene occasionally had its own rulers from the Ptolemaic dynasty.

== Kings of Cyrene, 163–30 BC ==
- Ptolemy VIII Physcon 163–116 BC
- Ptolemy Apion 116–96 BC
- Roman Republic 96–37 BC (officially annexed as a province in 74 BC)
- Ptolemaic Kingdom 37–34 BC
- Cleopatra Selene II (Queen) 34–30 BC

In 96 BC, the city became part of the Roman Republic, but it was restored to the Ptolemies by Mark Antony in 37 BC. In 34 BC Cleopatra VII and Antony's daughter, Cleopatra Selene II, was made Queen of Cyrene, but the city returned to Rome following Augustus' conquest of Egypt in 30 BC.
