= Hyporchema =

Historical Greek dance

The hyporchema (or "hyperchema") (Greek: ὑπόρχημα) was a lively kind of mimic dance which accompanied the songs used in the worship of Apollo, especially among the Dorians. It was performed by men and women. It is comparable to the geranos (γερανός), the ritual "crane dance" associated with Theseus.

A chorus of singers at the festivals of Apollo usually danced around the altar, while several other persons were appointed to accompany the action of the song with an appropriate mimic performance. Hyporchema was thus a lyric dance, and often passed into the playful and comic, whence Athenaeus compares it with the cordax of comedy. It had, according to the supposition of Müller, like all the music and poetry of the Dorians, originated in Crete, but was at an early period introduced in the island of Delos, where it seems to have continued to be performed down to the time of Lucian.

A similar kind of dance was the geranos (crane dance), which Theseus on his return from Crete was said to have performed in Delos, and which was customary in this island as late as the time of Plutarch. The leader of this dance was called geranoulkos. It was performed with blows, and with various turnings and windings, and was said to be an imitation of the windings of the Cretan labyrinth. When the chorus was at rest, it formed a semicircle, with leaders at the two wings.

The poems or songs which were accompanied by the hyporchema were likewise called hyporchemata. The first poet to whom such poems are ascribed was Thaletas of Crete: their character must have been in accordance with the playfulness of the dance which bore the same name, and by which they were accompanied. The fragments of the hyporchemata of Pindar confirm this supposition, for their rhythms are peculiarly light, and have a very imitative and graphic character. These characteristics must have existed in a much higher degree in the hyporchematic songs of Thaletas.
