= Archelaus (geographer) =

Ancient Greek writer

Archelaus (Ancient Greek: Ἀρχέλαος) was a geographer of ancient Greece who wrote a work in which he described all the countries which Alexander the Great had traversed.

It is possible that Archelaus was a contemporary of Alexander, and perhaps accompanied him on his expeditions, but as his work is completely lost, nothing certain can be said about the matter. It is also uncertain whether this Archelaus is the same as the one whose "Euboeica" are quoted by Harpocration, and whose works on rivers and stones are mentioned by Plutarch and Stobaeus.
