= Pheretima (Cyrenaean queen) =

Greek consort and regent (died 515 BC)

- Φερετίμα (Ancient Greek)
- Died: 515 BC; Egypt
- Citizenship: Greek (Dorian)
- Occupations: Queen consort of Cyrene; Regent of Cyrenaica
- Known for: Last recorded queen of the Battiad dynasty; Regent of Cyrene (c. 518–515 BC)
- Spouse: Battus III of Cyrene
- Children: Arcesilaus III of Cyrene; Ladice (wife of Pharaoh Amasis II of Egypt)

Pheretima or Pheretime (Ancient Greek: Φερετίμα, Φερετίμη, died 515 BC), was the wife of the Greek Cyrenaean King Battus III and the last recorded queen of the Battiad dynasty in Cyrenaica. She was regent of Cyrene in place of her son, Arcesilaus III of Cyrene, circa 518–515 BC.

== Biography ==
Little is known of Pheretima's life before or during her marriage. She was of Dorian Greek origin, and Herodotus states that her father was also called Battus. She married Battus sometime before he became king in 550 BC. They had two children: a son, Arcesilaus III, and a daughter, Ladice, who married the Egyptian pharaoh Amasis II.

=== Reign of Arcesilaus ===
When Battus died in 530 BC, Arcesilaus became king. In 525 BC, Arcesilaus made an alliance with King Cambyses II of Persia. About 518 BC, Arcesilaus demanded the return of the monarchical power his ancestors had possessed before his father's reform of the Cyrenaean constitution. This triggered a civil struggle in which Arcesilaus was defeated, and he and his mother were forced to leave Cyrenaica. Arcesilaus went to Samos, while Pheretima went to the court of King Euelthon in Salamis, Cyprus. While her son tried to recruit supporters in Samos, promising the men land in Cyrenaica, Pheretima asked Euelthon to give her an army to return to Cyrenaica. Euelthon refused to do so, but gave her various fine presents instead. Failing in her mission, Pheretima returned to Cyrenaica. Arcesilaus, however, recruited an army in Samos, returned with it to Cyrenaica, and retook his position. Arcesilaus murdered and exiled his political opponents, a decision which Pheretima probably influenced. Arcesilaus’ supporters received their promised land but they feared a backlash for their actions and ignored the oracle’s advice not to harm the Cyrenaean citizens.

=== Regency and later life ===
Arcesilaus left Cyrene for the Cyrenaean town of Barca, and Pheretima ruled the city in his stead. Arcesilaus and his father-in-law were murdered in the Barcaean marketplace by exiled Cyrenaean nobles exacting revenge. When Pheretima heard of this, she went to Arysandes, the Persian governor of Egypt, to seek assistance in avenging the death of her son, claiming it was Arcesilaus' friendship with the Persian king that caused his murder. Arysandes pitied Pheretima and gave her Egypt’s army and navy to command. Before she left for Egypt, Arysandes sent a herald to Barca to ask who murdered Arcesilaus. The Barcaeans replied that they were all responsible for Arcesilaus’ death. When the herald returned to Egypt with this answer, the army marched with Pheretima to Barca. They called upon those Barcaeans responsible for the murder to surrender, but the Barcaeans refused, and the subsequent siege lasted for nine months. Both the Persians and the Barcaeans lost many men.

Amasis, the commander of the Persian infantry, changed tactics once he realized that Barca could not be taken by force. He devised a plan to lure the Barcaeans out of the town based on a false offer to discuss an armistice. Amasis ordered his soldiers to dig a large trench in front of the city covered with wooden planks and earth in order to catch them. Amasis then invited the Barcaeans for a meeting and they came. The Barcaeans accepted the offer of ending the hostilities in exchange for a fair sum paid to the Persian king. The Barcaeans agreed, and opened the city gates. When the Barcaeans marched out of the city to accept the terms, they fell into the trap. Pheretima ordered the Barcaean wives’ breasts to be cut off, and gave the rest of the Barcaeans to the Persians as slaves. The Barcaeans were resettled by King Darius I of Persia in Bactria, and named their settlement Barca.

Pheretima was successful in avenging her son by punishing the Barcaeans. She returned to Egypt, and gave the army back to the governor. While in Egypt, Pheretima contracted a contagious parasitic skin disease, and died in late 515 BC. With her death Cyrenaean independence ceased. Her grandson Battus IV became king, but Cyrenaica became a vassal state of the Persian Empire.

== See also ==
- List of Kings of Cyrene

== Sources ==
- Herodotus, The Histories, Book 4
- Morkot, R., The Penguin Historical Atlas of Ancient Greece, Penguin Books, The Bath Press - Avon, Great Britain, 1996
- Dictionary of Greek and Roman Biography and Mythology, Volume 1, by William Smith
- A Dictionary of Greek and Roman Geography, by William Smith (1873)
- Polyaenus: Stratagems, Book 8, Chapters 26-71, Adapted from the translation by R.Shepherd (1793).
