= Arcesilaus III of Cyrene =

Cyrenaean King from c.530 BC to c.515 BC

King of Cyrene
- Reign: 530-515 BC
- Predecessor: Battus III
- Successor: Battus IV
- Born: Cyrene
- Died: 515 BC; Cyrene
- Issue: Battus IV
- Father: Battus III
- Mother: Pheretima
- Religion: Greek polytheism

Arcesilaus III of Cyrene (Greek: Ἀρκεσίλαος, flourished 6th century BC) was the sixth Greek Cyrenaean King and was a member of the Battiad dynasty. He succeeded his father as king of Cyrene in 530 BC, ruling until he was killed by Cyrenaean exiles around 515 BC.

== Ancestry ==
Arcesilaus was the son of the fifth Cyrenaean King, Battus III and queen Pheretima. His sister was Ladice, who married the Ancient Egyptian Pharaoh Amasis II. Although his maternal grandparents are unknown, his paternal grandparents were the queen Eryxo and king Arcesilaus II.

== First reign and exile ==
When his father died in 530 BC, Arcesilaus became the new king. In 525 BC, Arcesilaus made an alliance with King Cambyses II of Persia. Cambyses had recently conquered Egypt and added the country to his empire.

Herodotus describes his character as a ‘great rumpus‘. About 518 BC, Arcesilaus could no longer accept the Cyrenaean constitutional changes introduced by his late father and the Greek lawmaker, Demonax, and demanded the restoration of his ancestral rights. He was supported by his mother. In the civil struggles that followed, Arcesilaus was defeated and fled to the Greek island of Samos, while his mother fled to the court of king Euelthon in Salamis, Cyprus. Pheretima sought troops from the king of Salamis, but he declined her request.

In Samos, Arcesilaus recruited men for his army by promising to grant them land in Cyrene. Once he got his army together, he travelled to the oracle at Delphi to consult about his future in Cyrene. The priestess stated to him that his family would have a kingship in Cyrene for eight generations under four rulers named Battus and four rulers named Arcesilaus. She advised him to make no attempt to keep power beyond that period. She also advised him to be careful in how he treated the Cyrenaean citizens and that if he were cruel to them, they would go against him. Arcesilaus subsequently ignored the priestess' advice.

== Restoration and death ==
Arcesilaus returned to Cyrene with his army and was able to regain power, driving his political opponents out of Cyrene and into exile. His supporters received their land, but out of fear of a backlash (and ignoring the oracle's advice), Arcesilaus left Cyrene and went to the Cyrenaean town of Barca, whose governor, Alazir, was his father-in-law.

While in the marketplace in Barca with his father-in-law, some Cyrenaean exiles recognised Arcesilaus. The exiles approached the two men and killed them. Arcesilaus was buried near his paternal ancestors in Cyrene. Arcesilaus was succeeded by his mother, who ruled Cyrene until her death in 515 BC. After her death, she was succeeded by Arcesilaus's only son, Battus IV.

== See also ==
- List of Kings of Cyrene

== Sources ==
- Herodotus, The Histories, Book 4.
- https://www.livius.org/ct-cz/cyrenaica/cyrenaica.html
- http://www.mediterranees.net/dictionnaires/smith/cyrene.html

Arcesilaus III of Cyrene Battiad dynasty Died: 515 BC
Regnal titles
Preceded by Battus III	King of Cyrene; 530 BC – 515 BC	Succeeded by Battus IV
