= Polymnestus =

In ancient Greece, Polymnestus of Thera was, with Phronime, the father of Battus I of Cyrene.
