= Barca (ancient city) =

Ancient city of Libya

- Βάρκη (Ancient Greek) برقة (Arabic); Antaeopolis (Latin)
- Location within Libya
- 32.498333°N 20.892778°E
- Location: Libya
- Region: Marj District

Barca (Latin), also known as Barke (Ancient Greek: Βάρκη, Bárkē), Barka, Barqa, Barqah (Arabic: برقة, Barqah), and Barce (Latin and Italian) was an ancient, medieval, and early modern city located at the site of Marj in northeastern Libya. It remains a Catholic and Orthodox titular see.

== History ==
=== Ancient Barca ===
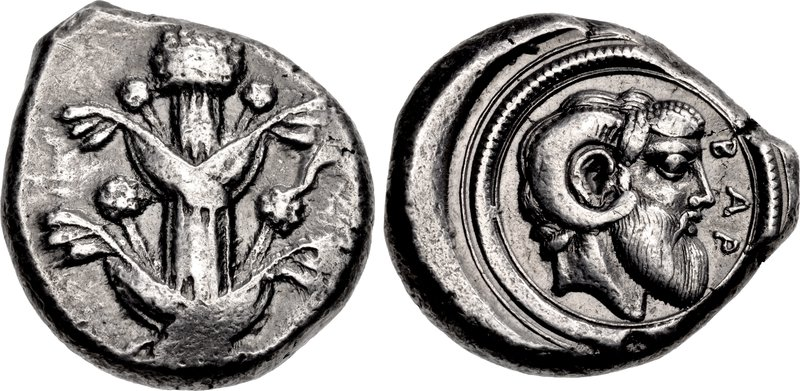
Coin minted in Barca in the Achaemenid Empire (475–435 BC)

Barca was situated at the site of the old town of Marj, approximately 100 kilometers (60 mi) northeast of Benghazi. No remains of the ancient settlement are visible at Marj, but some of the finds made there during the Italian colonial dominance of Libya (1913–41) are on display in the museum at Tolmeita.

Barca appears to be originally a settlement of the Libyan tribe Barraci. Later, Greek settlers from Cyrene colonized it. Archaeological evidence shows that Greek presence at Barca dates back to the seventh century BC. The city became a major economic centre due to its agricultural wealth. Herodotus places the foundation of the city around 560 BC, when the brothers of king Arcesilaus II of Cyrene quarrelled with him and left Cyrene to found Barca. The Barcans and Libyans defeated Arcesilaus II at the Battle of Leuco and killed him around 550 BC. Before 515 BC, Arcesilaus III of Cyrene was driven into exile and came to Barca, where he was assassinated. As a result, his mother Pheretime called on the Achaemenid governor of Egypt, Aryandes, for help. He besieged and sacked Barca in 515 BC. The Achaemenid king, Darius I, settled some of the Barcan captives in a village in Bactria, which was still flourishing in Herodotus' time. By the second half of the fifth century, Barca seems to have been the dominant city in the region.

In 324 BC, a Spartan mercenary leader, Thibron, joined forces with Cyrenean and Barcan exiles on Crete and invaded Cyrenaica. He was expelled, but returned in 322 BC. Cyreneans appealed to Ptolemy I who sent troops. Barca was absorbed into the Ptolemaic empire along with the rest of Cyrenaica. It was quickly eclipsed by its old port, which now received the name Ptolemais. Its decline was significant enough that when the Pentapolis, the league of the five most prominent cities of Cyrenaica, developed in the late Hellenistic period, Barca was not a member. Although small, it remained inhabited during the Roman and Byzantine periods. It was part of the province of Crete and Cyrenaica until 293, when it became part of the new province of Libya Superior, which formed part of the Praetorian prefecture of the East after 337.

=== Medieval Barqa ===
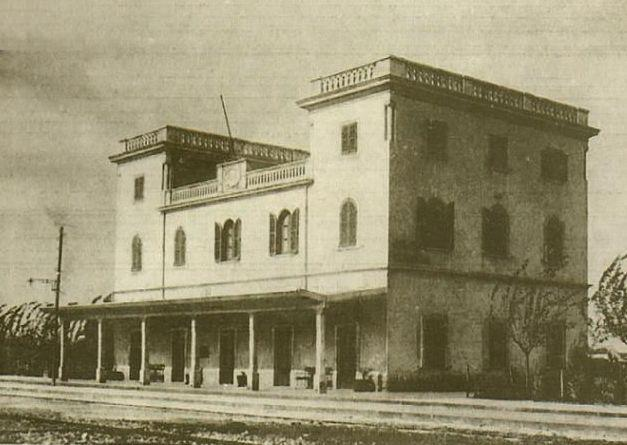
Main railway station in Italian Barce

Barca was one of the first cities to be taken by the Arabs in 643–644 during the Islamic conquest of North Africa. It originally served as the capital of the Barqah province of the Caliphate. The city's name, Arabized as Barqah, came to refer to the former state and province of Cyrenaica. Barca remained a significant city in the tenth century under the Fatimids and Al-Bakri reports that it was a wealthy city which exported wool, honey and fruit. The attacks of Banu Hilal in the 11th century led to a sharp decline and at some point it ceased to be inhabited. When the Ottoman Turks conquered the region in 1521, they used the Turkish form "Barka" for the province, but did not retain the city's status as its capital. The Ottomans used ancient ruins as building material for a castle at the site a little before 1852, when it was visited by James Hamilton. The castle was destroyed in the 1963 Marj earthquake.

== Religion ==
Early Christianity was spread from Palestine to Cyrenaica, a center of the Jewish community in Africa, by Mark of Cyrene and Simon of Cyrene. Synesius of Cyrene (370–414 AD), Bishop of Ptolemais, received his instruction at Alexandria in both the Catechetical School and the Museion, and he retained a great deal of reverence and affection for Hypatia, the last pagan Neoplatonist, whose classes he had attended. Synesius was raised to the episcopate by Theophilus, patriarch of Alexandria, in 410.

In accordance with a ruling of the Council of Nicaea in 325, Cyrenaica is recognized as ecclesiastically dependent on the See of Alexandria. Pentapolis is therefore included in the titles used both by the patriarch of the Coptic Church and by the Greek Orthodox Patriarch of Alexandria.

Although it was often destroyed and then restored during the Roman period, becoming a mere borough, Barca was, nevertheless, the seat of a bishopric. The bishops who participated in the First Council of Nicaea in 325 included the Arian Zopyros of Barca. Zenobius signed the acts of the Council of Ephesus in 431 and Theodorus took part in the Robber Council of Ephesus in 449, whose decisions were overthrown by the Council of Chalcedon in 451.

=== Orthodox titular see ===
The Metropolitan of Western Pentapolis held the most senior position in the Holy Synod of the Coptic Orthodox Church after that of the Pope of Alexandria. Since the demise of that eparchy as a major Archiepiscopal Metropolis in the days of Pope John VI of Alexandria, the position is held as a titular see attached to another diocese.

=== Latin Catholic titular see ===
Also for the Catholic Church, Barca, no longer a residential bishopric, is today listed as a titular see. Over the past century there have been 11 bishops of the Catholic titular See. The most recent has been Andraos Salama prior to his appointment as bishop of the Coptic Catholic Eparchy of Giza.

== See also ==
- Apollonia
- Ptolemais
