= Arcesilaus I of Cyrene =

King of Cyrenaica (died 583 BC)

King of Cyrenaica
- Reign: 600-583 BC
- Predecessor: Battus I
- Successor: Battus II
- Died: 583 BC; Cyrene
- Issue: Battus II; Critola
- House: Battiadae
- Father: Battus I
- Religion: Greek polytheism

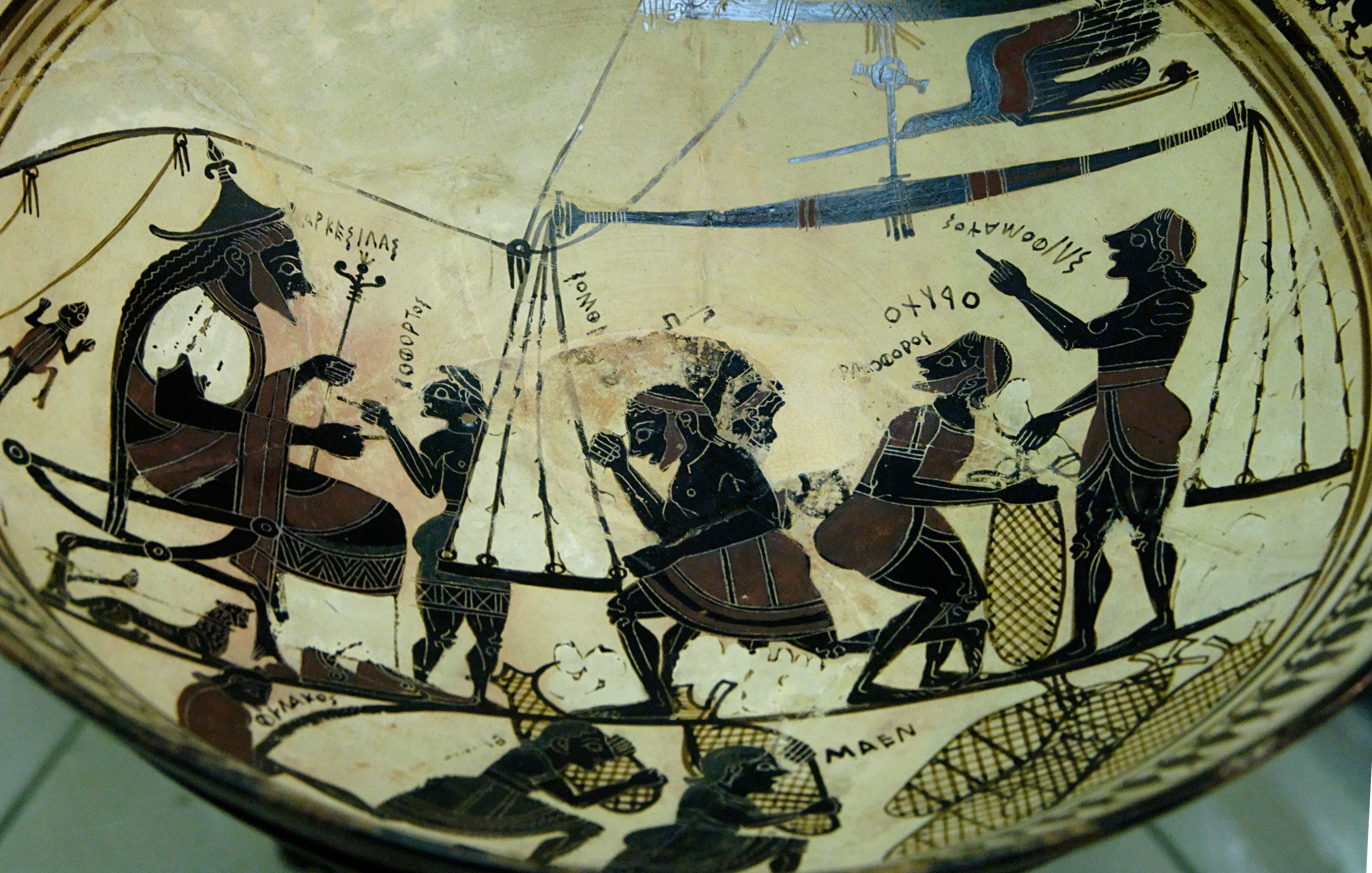
King Arcesilas of Cyrenaica overseeing the packaging of silphium into ships for export, a Spartan cylix, c. 580-550 B.C.

Arcesilaus I of Cyrene (Greek: Ἀρκεσίλαος; died 583 BC), also spelled Arkesilaos I, was the second Greek king of Cyrenaica and the second king of the Battiad dynasty.

== Ancestry ==
Arcesilaus was the son of Battus I, the first king of Cyrenaica and Cyrene. Arcesilaus’ paternal grandparents were the Cretan Princess Phronima and the distinguished Therean nobleman called Polymnestus.

== Reign ==
Very little is known on the life and reign of Arcesilaus. He succeeded to the throne after the death of his father in 600 BC. Herodotus says that the number of people in Cyrene during his reign remained equal to the original number of settlers under Battus. Arcesilaus died in 583 BC and was buried near his father.

== Offspring ==
His son, Battus II, succeeded him. Arcesilaus also had a daughter called Critola.

== See also ==
- List of Kings of Cyrene
- Cyrene
- Cyrenaica

== Sources ==
- Herodotus, The Histories, Book 4.
- Dictionary of Greek and Roman Biography and Mythology at Google Books
- Cyrene in A Dictionary of Greek and Roman Geography, by William Smith (1873)

Arcesilaus I of Cyrene Battiad dynasty Died: 583 BC
Regnal titles
Preceded by Battus I	King of Cyrene; 600 BC – 583 BC	Succeeded by Battus II
