= Battus I of Cyrene =

First Greek king of Cyrenaica (died 600 BC)

King of Cyrenaica
- Reign: 630-600 BC
- Predecessor: none
- Successor: Arcesilaus I of Cyrene
- Born: Thera
- Died: 600 BC; Cyrene
- Issue: Arcesilaus I
- House: Battiadae
- Father: Polymnestus
- Mother: Phronima
- Religion: Greek polytheism

Battus I of Cyrene (Ancient Greek: Βάττος), also known as Battius the Lacedaemonian and Battus Aristotle (Βάττος Ἀριστοτέλης) and Aristaeus (Ἀρισταῖος) was the founder (Oikistes) of the Ancient Greek colony of Cyrene. He was its first king, the first Greek king in Africa and the founder of the Battiad dynasty. The butterfly Battus philenor is named after him.

== Background ==
Battus was born on the Greek island of Thera. What is known of Battus’ family background is from the Greek historian Herodotus. His father, Polymnestus, was a Therean nobleman; Herodotus reports that the Cyrenes identify his mother as Phronima, daughter of Etearchus or Eteachos by his first wife, was King of Oaxus (a city on the Greek island of Crete).

Phronima’s stepmother (whose name is also unknown) did everything to torment Phronima, most notably by falsely accusing her of fornication. When Etearchus heard of this, he befriended a Therean merchant living in Oaxus called Themiston and convinced him to swear an oath that he would perform any task the king asked him to do. Etearchus produced Phronima and commanded him to throw her into the sea. Themiston, in order to clear himself of the obligation, took Phronima on his ship, lowered her into water with a rope, and hauled her back in the ship (i.e. he did not kill her as ordered). Themiston then sailed with Phronima back to his home island of Thera. There, Phronima became the mistress of Polymnestus, who was a member of the Minyan family of the Euphemidae.

Phronima bore Polymnestus a son, Battus. Herodotus does not give his real name, but according to Pindar, his birth name was Aristotle. Justin gives him the name of Aristaeus and states after his death in Cyrene he was worshipped by the name of Aristaeus. In any case, Battus in ancient Greek means stammer (because he had a speech impediment as a child); however Herotodus states that in the Libyan language battus means "king". Herodotus opines that he was not known as Battus until he left for Libya.

== Delphic consultations ==
In c. 639 BC the king of Thera, Grinus, travelled from the island to visit the oracle of Delphi, to seek advice on various matters. At that time, Thera had a severe drought and there was no rainfall for seven years. The population was also increasing and could no longer support its residents. One of the men that accompanied the king was Battus. When Grinus asked for the priestess' advice, she gave him a seemingly irrelevant response. She told him that he must go to Libya and found a city there, on advice from the god Apollo. The king was too old for this journey and commissioned Battus to complete the task. The only problem was that neither of them knew where Libya was.

When Grinus and Battus returned to Thera, the drought had worsened and the people were in great distress. The king sent some Thereans to once again seek the advice of the Oracle. The priestess repeated the same message, that they must found a colony in Libya for their fortunes to mend. Grinus then sent a group of men to Crete to inquire about the natives of Libya or anyone who had been to Libya. The group of men landed in Itanus and met a fisherman called Corobius, who explained to the men that he had once been blown out of course and ended up on Platea, an island off the Libyan coast.

== Initial efforts ==
The Thereans paid Corobius to come with them to Thera and shortly after, with a small party and Corobius as pilot, they set sail for Libya. The men landed on Platea and left Corobius there with enough supplies for a short while and then returned to their island bringing good news about finding the new colony. Corobius agreed to wait on Platea for a length of time, however his supplies began to run out. Luckily, a Samian vessel bound for Egypt under command of Colaeus was re-routed to Platea due to poor weather conditions. The crew gave Corobius enough food to last one year. Colaeus and his crew were anxious to reach their destination as easterly winds prevented them from travelling to Egypt and they were driven as west as the Pillar of Hercules (modern Strait of Gibraltar). By their luck they landed at the wealthy trading post of Tartessus.

When the group of Thereans returned to their island and had told everyone of the new settlement, they decided then to send a new party of people representing the seven villages of the island (drawn by lot). The King and the people picked Battus as the leader for the journey to Platea. According to the Cyrenaican version, Battus and the others sailed in two penteconters. When the two ships had reached the coast, Battus could not decide what next to do and ordered that they sail back home. When they returned to Thera, however, the locals refused to allow them back on the shore and threw things at them from the harbour, shouting for Battus and his crew to go back.

== Founding of Cyrene ==
Battus and the two ships journeyed once more to Platea, where they lived for two years, unable to establish themselves properly there. Leaving one man on the island, they returned to Delphi and consulted the Oracle again about Libya and their current poor conditions. She advised them to settle on the mainland. So, they sailed back to Platea, and established a settlement, a town called Aziris (south of Platea near a river and many valleys). The Thereans lived there for six years on friendly terms with the Libyans. After a treaty with the locals, the Libyans persuaded them to leave Aziris and took them west through fine agricultural country called Irasa to Apollo's Fountain. The Libyan guides told Battus and his group of men "this is the place for you settle in, for here there is a hole in the sky". This may refer to the great amount of rainfall in the area, which is rare in North Africa.

Battus named this new settlement (founded in c. 630 BC) Cyrene. The name comes from a fountain called "Cyre", which was believed to have been consecrated to Apollo. In addition to naming the settlement, Battus made all the colonists swear an oath. There is an inscription dated from the 4th century BC, which claims to contain the original oath.

Although little is known of Battus' reign, he appeared to govern with mildness and moderation. He was also apparently a vigorous ruler, successful in cementing a colony and taking advantages of the natural surrounding environment.

== Death ==
Battus died in 600 BC and was worshipped as a heroic figure by his subjects. His grave is near the marketplace which joins the road whose construction he ordered, leading to the temple of Apollo. A statue of Battus was dedicated at Delphi, by the subjects of Cyrene. He is represented riding in a chariot driven by the nymph of Cyrene, with a figure symbolising Libya in the act of crowning him King.

His dynasty is known as the Battiad dynasty after him. He was succeeded by his son Arcesilaus I.

== See also ==
- List of kings of Cyrene

== Sources ==
- Boardman, John, The Greeks Overseas, Penguin, Harmondsworth, 1973 (1964)
- Herodotus, The Histories, Book 4.
- Morkot, R., The Penguin Historical Atlas of Ancient Greece, Penguin Books, The Bath Press - Avon, Great Britain, 1996.
- Burn, A R. The Penguin History Greece, Penguin Books, Clay Ltd, St Ives P/C, England, 1990.
- https://books.google.com/books?id=yFoGAAAAQAAJ&dq=battus+i+of+cyrene&pg=RA1-PA476
- Cyrenaica at Livius.org
- "Battus" . Encyclopædia Britannica. Vol. 3 (11th ed.). 1911. p. 535.
- Cyrene in A Dictionary of Greek and Roman Geography, by William Smith (1873)

Battus I of Cyrene Battiad dynasty Died: 600 BC
Regnal titles
New title	King of Cyrene; 630 BC–600 BC	Succeeded by Arcesilaus I
