= Arcesilaus II of Cyrene =

Greek king of Cyrenaica from 560 BC to 550 BC

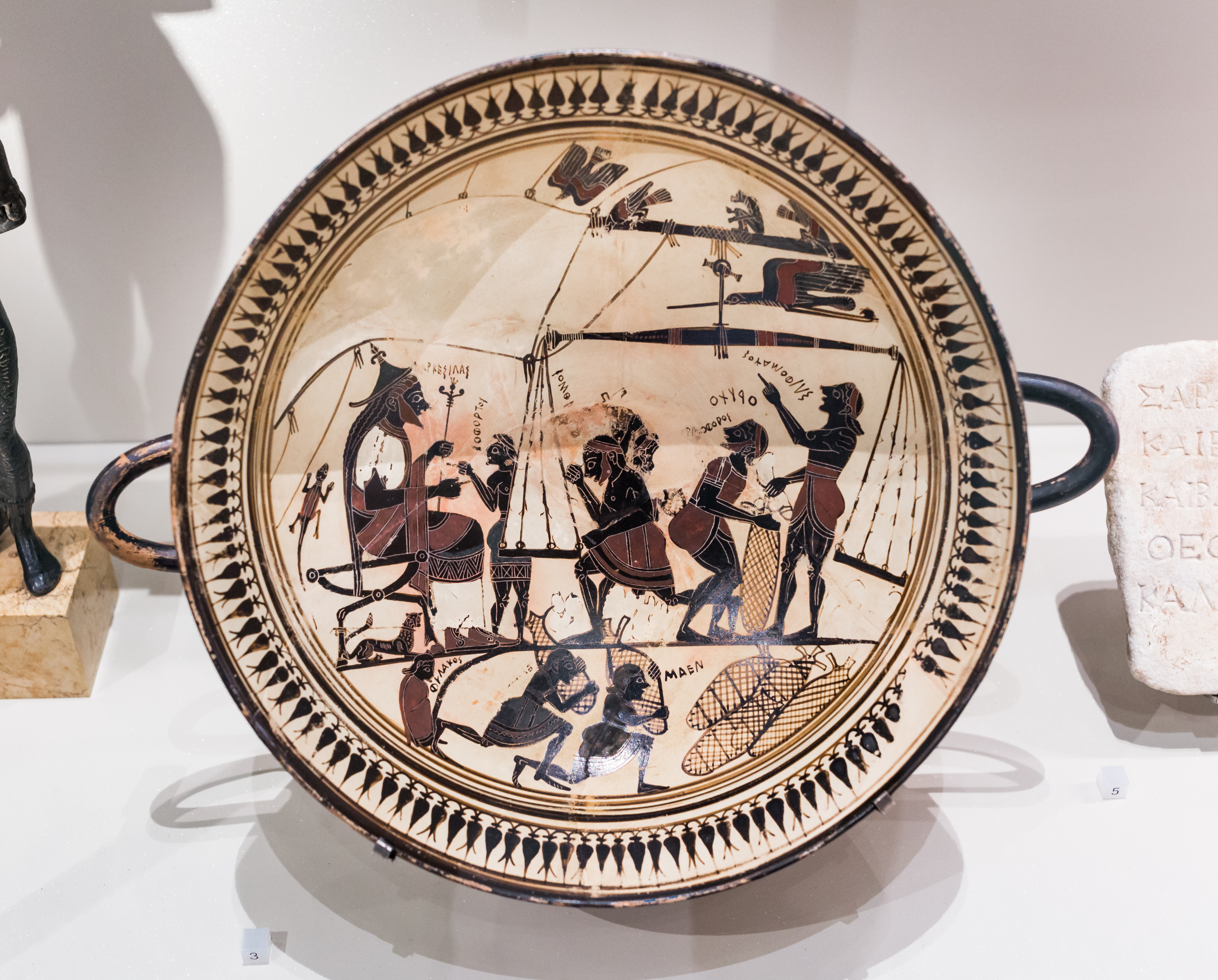

King of Cyrenaica
- Reign: 560-550 BC
- Predecessor: Battus II
- Successor: Learchus (pretender)
- Born: Cyrene
- Died: 550 BC; Cyrene
- Spouse: Eryxo
- Issue: Battus III
- House: Battiadae
- Father: Battus II
- Religion: Greek religion

Arcesilaus II of Cyrene, surnamed the Oppressor, the Severe or the Harsh (Greek: Ἀρκεσίλαος ὁ Χαλεπός, flourished 6th century BC), was the fourth Greek king of Cyrenaica and was a member of the Battiad dynasty. It was from his reign that the dynasty began to decline in power and influence.

== Ancestry and Relations ==
Arcesilaus II was the son of the third Greek Cyrenaean King Battus II, while his mother is unknown. His paternal aunt was the Greek Cyrenaean Princess Critola and his paternal grandfather was the second Greek Cyrenaean King Arcesilaus I.

Arcesilaus’ wife Eryxo was his paternal cousin, and was Critola’s youngest child. Arcesilaus and Eryxo had married before he succeeded his father. His father died in 560 BC and Arcesilaus ascended the throne. Arcesilaus and Eryxo had a son who would be the future Cyrenaean King Battus III. Plutarch states Arcesilaus had another paternal cousin called Polyarchus, who was Eryxo’s eldest brother. Arcesilaus also had other paternal male cousins, although their names are not known.

== Character ==
Plutarch states that Arcesilaus' character was different from his father’s and received the surname ‘The Oppressor‘, because his character and appearance was of a rugged deposition. During his father’s reign Arcesilaus had built fortifications around his house and became known throughout Cyrenaica for doing this.

== Learchus ==
When Arcesilaus became king, Learchus (or Laarchus) became his advisor. Herodotus states that Learchus was his brother, however Plutarch states that Learchus was an ill-mannered and vicious friend. Arcesilaus followed the counsels of Learchus and became more of a tyrant than a king. Learchus was secretly plotting behind Arcesilaus to become Cyrenaica’s new king. Learchus had ordered the banishment and deaths of noble Cyrenaeans.

When Arcesilaus had found out about Learchus’ plotting, Arcesilaus had quarrelled with Learchus about the kingship and Learchus falsely blamed his plotting on him. Arcesilaus had ordered Learchus and his supporters to be exiled from Cyrenaica.

Learchus and his supporters left Cyrene and created their own settlement called Barca, (sometimes known as Meri, Libya). During the construction of Barca, Learchus was able to persuade local Libyans to withdraw their allegiance from Cyrene and encourage them to come with him and to declare war on Arcesilaus.

Learchus and the local Libyans were alarmed of the Cyrenaean troops approaching them and they hastily withdrew. Arcesilaus and the Cyrenaean troops chased Learchus and his supporters as far as Leucon, when Learchus and his supporters decided to attack the king and his army. Arcesilaus and the Cyrenaean troops were defeated and he lost up to 7,000 hoplites.

== Death and burial ==
Not so long after the defeat, near Leucon Arcesilaus became very ill after drinking a poisonous drink containing a deadly fish called a sea-hare. According to Plutarch this fish when consumed is fatal to people. Learchus strangled and killed Arcesilaus in 550 BC. Learchus returned to Cyrene and after his attempt to become the new king, Eryxo and Polyarchus successfully plotted to have Learchus murdered. Then Battus III was proclaimed king by Polyarchus. Arcesilaus’ body was returned to Cyrene and was buried near his paternal ancestors.

== See also ==
- Cyrenaica
- Cyrene
- List of Kings of Cyrene

=== Sources ===
- Herodotus, The Histories, Book 4.
- Morkot, R., The Penguin Historical Atlas of Ancient Greece, Penguin Books, The Bath Press - Avon, Great Britain, 1996.
- Google Books
- Livius.org
- Mediterranees.net
- Penelope.uchicago.edu
- Bostonleadershipbuilders.com

Arcesilaus II of Cyrene Battiad dynasty Died: 550 BC
Regnal titles
Preceded by Battus II	King of Cyrene; 560 BC – 550 BC	Succeeded by Battus III
