= Hagnon, son of Nikias =

5th-century BC Athenian general and statesman

Hagnon, son of Nikias (Ancient Greek: ῞Αγνων ὁ Νικίου) was an Athenian general and statesman. In 437/36 BC, he led the settlers who founded the city of Amphipolis in Thrace; in the Peloponnesian War, he served as an Athenian general on several occasions, and was one of the signers of the Peace of Nicias and the alliance between Athens and Sparta. In 411 BC, during the oligarchic coup, he supported the oligarchy and was one of the ten commissioners (probouloi) appointed to draw up a new constitution.

Hagnon's first appearance in the historical records is in 440 BC, when he is mentioned as one of the generals bringing 40 triremes from Athens to reinforce Pericles at the Siege of Samos. In 437/36 BC, he led a group of Greek colonists to found a city at the mouth of the river Strymon. Two previous attempts to found an Athenian colony on this valuable location (the site was desirable both because of its strategic position on the trade routes between the Hellespont and mainland Greece and because it was the primary outlet for trade from the wealthy Strymon valley) had been defeated by hostile native populations, but Hagnon, leading a multinational force of settlers, defeated the Edonians who held the location and founded the city of Amphipolis on an island in the river. For a number of years, Hagnon was honored as the founder of Amphipolis, but in 422 BC, with Amphipolis allied to Sparta and at war with Athens, the Amphipolitans transferred that honor to the Spartan general Brasidas, who died fighting outside that city while preventing an Athenian attempt to recapture it.

Hagnon held military command for Athens on several occasions, sharing in the command of the force that sailed against Samos in the Samian War of 440 BC and commanding a force that attempted to capture Potidaea in 430 BC. In 421 BC, he was one of the Athenian signers of the Peace of Nicias, the treaty, negotiated by an Athenian general with the same name as his father (no relation), that brought an end to the so-called Archidamian War, the first stage of the Peloponnesian War; he also signed the alliance between Athens and Sparta that was concluded in that same year.

In 411 BC, when revolutionary forces at Athens took advantage of the disorder in the wake of the Sicilian Expedition to overthrow the Athenian democracy and replace it with an oligarchy, Hagnon was a member of the government of 400 oligarchs that was established, and served as one of the ten commissioners charged with drafting a new constitution. His son Theramenes, meanwhile, played a central role in both the establishment and the overthrow of that government.
