= Peace of Nicias =

421 BC treaty between Athens and Sparta

- Type: Peace treaty
- Signed: March 421 BC
- Signatories: Nicias; King Pleistoanax
- Parties: Athens; Sparta
- Language: Ancient Greek

The Peace of Nicias was a peace treaty signed between the Greek city-states of Athens and Sparta in March 421 BC that ended the first half of the Peloponnesian War.

== Background ==
In 425 BC, the Spartans had lost the battles of Pylos and Sphacteria, a severe defeat resulting in the Athenians holding 292 prisoners. At least 120 were Spartiates, who had recovered by 424 BC, when the Spartan general Brasidas captured Amphipolis. In the same year, the Athenians suffered a major defeat in Boeotia at the Battle of Delium, and in 422 BC, they were defeated again at the Battle of Amphipolis in their attempt to take back that city. Both Brasidas, the leading Spartan general, and Cleon, the leading politician in Athens, were killed at Amphipolis. By then, both sides were exhausted and ready for peace.

The treaty was signed with the agreement of both Sparta and Athens, considering the disadvantages faced by both polis during the first Peloponnesian War. The Athenians were motivated after they lost the Battle of Delium and the Battle of Amphipolis, which eroded their confidence in military strength. They were also concerned about their allies, worrying that they may be emboldened by the loss of Athens, potentially leading to a rebellion among them. The Athenian regretted not reaching an agreement earlier when a favourable opportunity for a peace treaty was offered by Sparta during the Battle of Pylos.

From Sparta’s perspective, the failures in battles caused them to lose confidence and feel stressed about the future trajectory of the Peloponnesian War, while the new threat resulting from the termination of the peace treaty with the Argives further heightened Spartan's willingness to pursue peace. For the Spartans, the failure of the yearly invasion tactic had extended the war beyond Sparta's expectation, and the losses at Pylos and Cythera, had made Sparta ready for peace. Also, Sparta had a strong incentive for peace, given its significant disadvantage position in the Peloponnesian War after the death of Brasidas. The morale of the Spartans suffered greatly from the loss of soldiers and Brasidas since their chances of winning the war had diminished, and they were unable to execute any of Brasidas’s plans with their own forces. As a result, the Spartans strongly desired peace compared to the beginning of the war.

Furthermore, the thirty-year peace treaty with Argos was about to expire, and the Argives (inhabitants of Argos) refused to sign another truce unless Cynuria, a contested border region between Sparta and Argos, was restored to them. The Spartans calculated that it would be difficult to win both wars against the Athenians and the Argives at the same time. Moreover, they anticipated potential uprisings by some of the cities in Peloponnesus against the Argives based on past experience. Therefore, the immense loss and stress faced by Sparta easily pushed them to negotiate with Athens to restore their military power, and prevent attacks from both Athens and Argos.

Within these situations faced by Sparta and Athens, both poleis were probably weary by 421, and were willing to let the war end in a deadlock, until they could restore allies from different peninsulas affected by the war. This viewpoint is reinforced by clear evidence that neither Athens nor Sparta had managed to strike their opponent with a fatal blow in a decade of scattered battling, and such a blow did not appear in a short while.

== Negotiation ==
The negotiations were started by Pleistoanax, King of Sparta, and Nicias, an Athenian general. The most amicable proposal was to return everything to the prewar state except for Nisaea and Plataea. Athens would retain control of Nisaea and Thebes would retain control over Plataea. Amphipolis would be returned to Athens and Pylos would be returned to Sparta. Athenians would release the Spartan prisoners taken at Sphacteria and Sparta together with Thebes would return Athenian prisoners. Temples throughout Greece would be open to worshipers from all cities, and the oracle at Delphi would regain its autonomy. Athens would continue to collect tribute from the states from which it had received it since the time of Aristides, but Athens could not force them to become allies. Athens also agreed to come to Sparta's aid if the helots revolted. Few of Sparta's allies agreed to sign the peace. Boeotia, Corinth, Elis, Megara and Amphipolis opposed the treaty.

It is noted that some poleis declared neutrality to prevent being involved in the conflicts between Sparta and Athens. The Peace of Nicias designated 6 cities as neutral to ensure their safety by preventing reprisals from the Athenians. According to Thucydides; Argilus, Stagirus, Acanthus, Stolus, Olynthus and Spartolus were listed as neutral cities, not aligning themselves with either Sparta or Athens in the peace treaty. However, it was specified that if the Athenians were successful in convincing these cities, it would be legitimate for them to form allies with these cities, respecting their wills and autonomy. It is suggested that the declaration of neutrality by these six cities in the Peace of Nicias has largely been seen as a temporary compromise aimed at safeguarding against Athenian revenge following Sparta's retreat from Thrace.

Seventeen representatives from each side swore an oath to uphold the treaty, which was meant to last for fifty years. The Spartan representatives were the kings Pleistoanax and Agis II, Pleistolas, Damagetus, Chionis, Metagenes, Acanthus, Daithus, Ischagoras, Philocharidas, Zeuxidas, Antiphus, Tellis, Alcindas, Empedias, Menas, and Laphilus. The Athenian representatives were Lampon, Isthmonicus, Nicias, Laches, Euthydemus, Procles, Pythodorus, Hagnon, Myrtilus, Thrasycles, Theagenes, Aristocrates, Iolcius, Timocrates, Leon, Lamachus, and Demosthenes. However, Athens's chief goal, the restoration of Amphipolis, was denied when Clearidas obtained from the Spartans a clause in the treaty negating the transfer.

== Aftermath and Effectiveness ==
There is a discussion regarding the effectiveness of the Peace of Nicias, and the factors that led to the treaty being broken, failing to meet the expectation of lasting for 50 years. The treaties were considered useless from the beginning, due to the prevailing atmosphere of hostility among numerous former enemies, with most of the terms of the agreement being ignored or only partially executed. Even though Thucydides indicated that the treaty lasted around six years and ten months, during which both poleis attacked each other’s territories, some scholars suggest that the treaty broke much earlier, since Athenian and Spartan forces encountered each other at Mantineia around 3 years after the Peace of Nicias was established.

Several factors led to the peace treaty failing quickly. Most historians have noted that the militant factions in both Athens and Sparta gained power shortly after the truce was signed. They have accused these groups of undermining a compromise negotiated by their more conciliatory counterparts. As a result, the treaty fell short of the expected duration of 50 years as, the ambition of both Athens and Sparta escalated after the military forces assumed power, leading to dissatisfaction and the collapse of the peace treaty.

Another factor was the opposition from the allies of Sparta, including Boeotia, Corinth, Megara and Elis. Based on Thucydides's description, the representatives of Sparta’s allies were present in Lacedaemon, and the Spartans ordered those who had not yet ratified the treaty to do so. However, these allies for the same reasons they had initially rejected it, refused to accept it unless a more equitable agreement could be reached. The peace treaty turned out to be a huge disadvantage for some allies of Sparta. Those who had suffered were unable to reclaim their territories lost in the Peloponnesian War, while Athens and its allies’ sought to retain their land, leading to the loss of gains for the victorious allies due to Athens’ demand.

According to Thucydides, Boeotia refused to return both the Athenian captives captured during the Peloponnesian War, and the border fortress of Panactum acquired in 422 to the Athenians. It is suggested that the Boeotians, under the leadership of the Thebans, significantly enhanced their power, reputation, and ambition throughout the war, particularly after their pivotal role in defeating the Athenians at Delium. These successes happened when Athens was engaged in a major conflict with the Peloponnesians, threatening Theban's position with the Peace of Nicias. Therefore, it is likely that Boeotia was dissatisfied with the treaty, as it did not align with the gains that they had achieved in the aftermath of the first Peloponnesian War, and signing the treaty hardly fulfilled their ambitions. Furthermore, the Peace of Nicias allowed Athens to shift focus from the warfare with Sparta to dealing with and pressure on Boeotia, enabling them to reclaim their losses from the first Peloponnesian War.

From Corinth’s perspective, none of the issues that triggered Corinth to join the first Peloponnesian War were resolved. Firstly, Potidaea, a colony of Corinth, was firmly in Athenian hands, forcing its inhabitants, descendants of Corinthian immigrants, to leave their homes. Furthermore, another colony of Corinth, Corcyra, stayed allied to Athens, while Megara, Corinth's neighbour, was terrified by the Athenian force at Nisaea. In addition, Corinth had lost territory in the northwest. With Sollium and Anactorium remaining under enemy control, and Corinthian influence in the area being diminished. Therefore, Corinth considered that only the defeat of Athens would allow them to regain their former position, leading the Corinthians to reject the peace and attempt to disturb the resulting diplomatic situation.

For Megara, the agriculture land had been repeatedly destroyed in the warfare, and the city was nearly taken over by the Athenians. Moreover, its major port on the Saronic Gulf, Nisaea had fallen into Athenian hands, and the terms of the Peace of Nicias did not guarantee its return to Megara, which posed a danger to Megara's economy and defence. From Elis' perspective, they were displeased with Sparta's actions, believing that the Spartans had taken one of their cities in the name of protection, and signed an agreement with Athens to refrain from interfering in the war, even if their allies were under attack. Furthermore, Elis disapproved of Sparta’s controlling stance in alliance decisions, particularly regarding the issue of the Argives. The dissatisfaction with Sparta's decision caused Elis to refuse to agree on the Peace of Nicias, contributing to the treaty’s vulnerabilities and eventual breakdown.

Despite the situation and the loss of these allies, they were keen to reject the Peace of Nicias, even as Sparta pressured the Peloponnesian League to join the treaty. By agreeing to the treaties without consideration and achieving the allies’ requirements, Sparta lost the trust of its allies, which worsened the relationships between the poleis. As a result, uncertainties arose, since the polis that refused to sign the treaty could potentially face conflict with or be attacked by Athens, as the unresolved conflicts from the first Peloponnesian War persisted.

== See also ==
- List of treaties
