= Battle of Megara =

424 BCE battle between Athens and Megara

- Part of the Peloponnesian War
Date	424 BCE
Location	Megara, Greece
Result	Spartan victory

Belligerents
Athens	Megara; Sparta

Commanders and leaders
Hippokrates; Demosthenes	Brasidas

Strength
600 Athenian hoplites under Hippocrates; Unknown number of light-armed Plataeans and Athenian hoplites under Demosthenes; 4,000 Athenian hoplites and 600 cavalry in the second wave	Megara: Unknown number of Megarian militia; Brasidas' taskforce: 2,700 Corinthian hoplites; 400 hoplites from Phlius; 700 hoplites from Sicyon; Boeotian reinforcements: 2,200 Boeotian hoplites; 600 Boeotian cavalry

The Battle of Megara was fought in 424 BC between Athens and Megara, an ally of Sparta. Whilst the Athenian forces were initially successful against the Peloponnesian garrison there, a hasty arrival of Spartan forces under Brasidas saw a stalemate and eventual victory of the oligarchic party within the city of Megara and the withdrawal of Athenian forces.

Megara was in the country of Megarid, between central Greece and the Peloponnese. Megara, an ally of Sparta, consisted of farming villages, with flat plains and foothills, and hosted two harbors: Pagae (modern Alepochori-Corinthian Gulf) and Nisaia (Saronic Gulf), making it a prime focus of contention^{1}.

== Background ==
Attica had been under siege by the Peloponnesian army led by the Spartan king, Archidamus II. The area siege kept Athenians stuck in their city. However, with the Peloponnesian withdrawal, Athens began to attack. From as early as 431 BC, Megara was under consistent attack from Athens. During the first invasion, Athens brought 10,000 Athenians and numerous allies.

Athens then set up a fort on Salamis, near Nisaia, and created shipping blockades. The blockades delayed imports of food and supplies to Megara. Megarians still had control of Pagae, but Megara was effectively isolated from the western food supplies. Unable to produce normal proportions of food, the situation in Megara began to become dire.

Urged by the Megarian oligarchy in 429, the Peloponnesian fleet attacked the Athenian fort at Salamis. Unknown to the Peloponnesians, the attack was revealed to Athens by beacon lights. Athens dispatched a fleet from the Athenian port of Piraeus. The Peloponnesian attack was abandoned because the Megarian ships were in a state of disrepair.

Under the rule of the pro-Spartan and pro-Corinthian oligarchy, Megara lost the port city of Minoa to Athens in 427, was a contributing factor in more civil unrest. Megarian revolutions against the oligarchy began shortly after and Megara became democratic.

The oligarchy were exiled. Many exiles were permitted by Sparta to inhabit the Boeotian town of Plataea for a year^{2}. Boeotia separated Megara and Athens with high mountains ranges in the north^{1}. The Spartans were then able to prevent interactions between Megarian Democrats and Athenians on Minoa^{2}.

The exiled Megarians in Plataea, began northern raids in Megarid and took Pagae. With oligarch sympathizers still in Megara, the oligarchs returned to Megara in 427 BC, and democracy collapsed.

It is suspected that Athens prevented food supplies to gain control of Megara and prevent further invasions of Attica by the Peloponnesians. However, Athens' capture of Pylos in 425 detained the Peloponnesian army in Messenia, which lessened the importance of Megara to Athenians. Athens had also successfully trapped hundreds of Spartans on Sphacteria. The Spartans removed all military forces from Messina and arranged a truce. Ambassadors were sent to Athens without consulting Spartan allies. Athens had extensive demands, and Sparta requested a private discussion.

Spartan allies were uneasy with the scenario. Megara had a distrust of the Spartans since the Revolution. Megarians feared that Sparta would turn over Nisaia to the Athenians. Meanwhile, within the walls of Megara, the Democrats planned to aid Athens in capturing the long walls of Nisaia. Athens then discredited the Spartan embassy because of its request for privacy and so the truce failed.

== 'Battle' in practice ==
During the night, Athenians and their allies approached Megara from Minoa and the road to Eleusis. The plan worked, and the Peloponnesian garrison was effectively isolated from the city. As morning came, Megarian Democrats pretended to be outraged by the captured walls. The Democrats encouraged Megarians to open the city gates and attack the Athenians and then decorated themselves with oil to be easily distinguished from other Megarians. At the crucial moment, the plot was uncovered by the Oligarchs, and the gate remained closed.

Athens sensed the change of plan and attacked the Nisaia garrison. Spartans were taken as prisoners and the Peloponnesians were allowed to ransom themselves. The Spartan commander, Brasidas, appeared with an army larger than the Athenians. The two cavalries fought under the walls of Megara.

The oligarchs opened the gate to Brasidas and their allies. The Athenians declined to battle with the Peloponnesians. Over time, Brasidas and Athens both left the city. The Peloponnesian armies stayed. Rhetorically, Brasidas was able to employ the memory of Athenian hesitance in Megara to great effect during his remaining campaigns.
