= Proboulos =

In ancient Greece, a proboulos (Ancient Greek: πρόβουλος, próboulos) was a magistrate on a preliminary deliberative body.

Classical scholar Xavier Riu writes that it was a position created during the Peloponnesian War "to cope with the difficult situation of Athens at that moment of the war, and it was formed by aged and probably very respected men." A committee of 10 probouloi was appointed in Athens in 413 BC after the failure of the Sicilian Expedition. The committee seems to have taken on duties from both the boule and the prytaneis, and they were granted the ability to bypass the ecclesia in order to expedite the war effort. The probouloi also played a role in the Athenian coup of 411 BC, which established the short-lived oligarchy of the Four Hundred. Among the notable probouloi were the playwright Sophocles and the general Hagnon.

Aristotle discusses the probouloi in his Politics, believing the committee to be undemocratic and oligarchical.

A proboulos appears as an antagonist in Aristophanes' comedy Lysistrata, engaging in a debate with the titular protagonist and going on a tirade against her when he loses.

Probouloi is also the term used to refer to delegates to meetings of the Ionian states at the Panionian.
