= Argileonis =

Mother of 5th-century BC Spartan officer, Brasidas

Argileonis (Ancient Greek: Ἀργιλεωνίς), mother of the Spartan officer Brasidas, who fought in the Peloponnesian War.

When the ambassadors from Amphipolis brought the news of Brasidas's death, Argileonis asked if he had behaved bravely; and on their speaking of him in reply as the best of the Spartans, answered that the strangers were in error; Brasidas was a brave man, but there were many better in Sparta. The answer became famous, and Argileonis is said to have been rewarded for it by the ephors.
