= Nikolaos Mykonios =

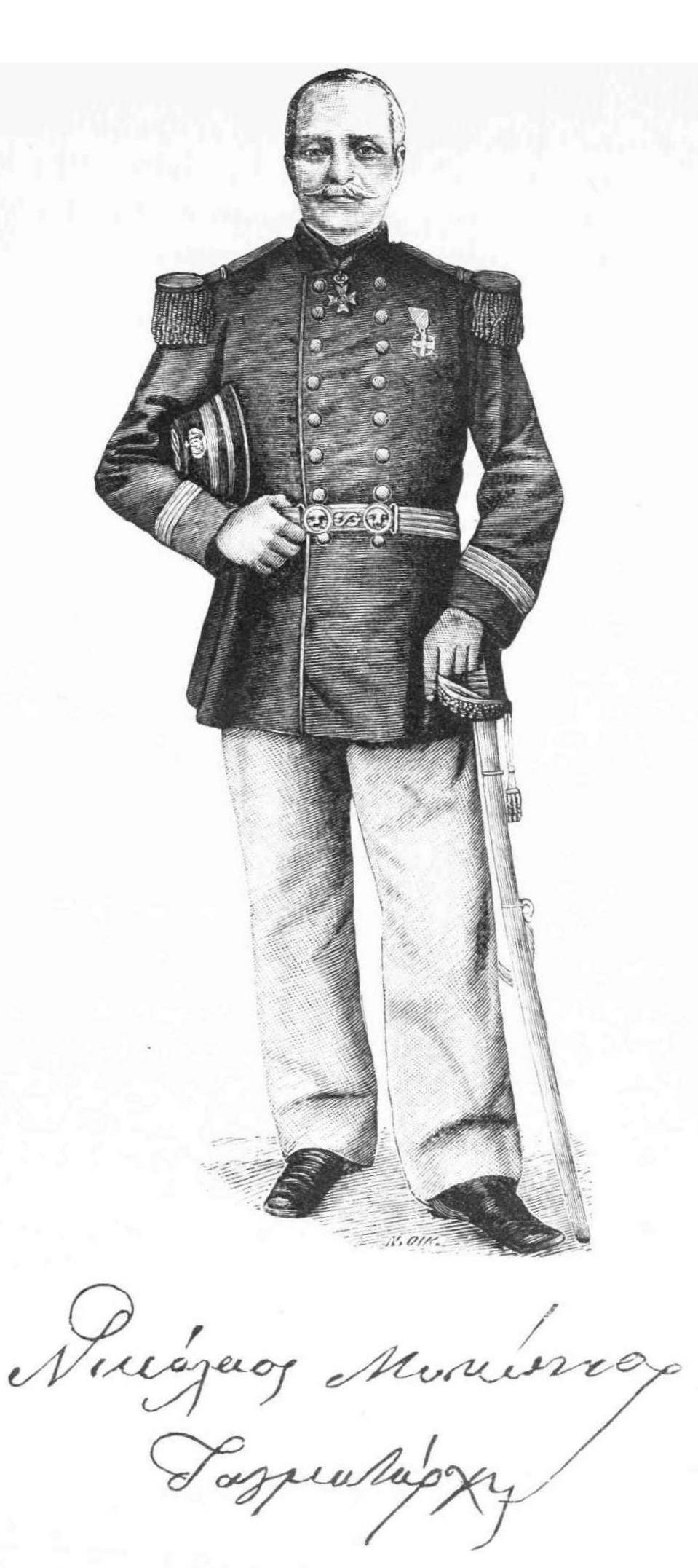
Nikolaos Mykonios as an officer of the Hellenic Army

Nikolaos Mykonios (Greek: Νικόλαος Μυκώνιος, November 6, 1803 – March 21, 1890) was a fighter of the Greek War of Independence and later an officer of the Greek army.

== Biography ==
Mykonios was born in Koronida of Naxos on November 6, 1803. He took part in the Greek War of Independence, serving first in the naval battles, and from 1825 as a non-commissioned officer in the regular revolutionary army which was created in Nafplio. Under the command of Charles Nicolas Fabvier, he fought in the campaign of Tripolitsa, in the battle of Megara, in the battle of Chaidari, where he was injured (and promoted to sergeant for valour), in the siege of the Acropolis where he was injured again, in the Karystos campaign (wounded again), and in the Chios expedition. In 1828 in Chios, on the orders of Fabvier he fell into the sea and swam to the opposite shore alerting the boats there, which came for reinforcement and saved all the regular Greek army in Chios from potential disaster.

After the creation of the Greek State, Mykonios followed a military career reaching the rank of the major of Infantry. He retired on December 4, 1861. and he died in Athens on March 21, 1890.

== Bibliography ==
- Konstantinos Skokos (1891). Ημερολόγιον Σκόκου. Athens: Εκ του Τυπογραφείου των Καταστημάτων Ανέστη Κωνσταντινίδου.
- Μεγάλη Στρατιωτική και Ναυτική Εγκυκλοπαίδεια, Athens 1927.
