= Cleon =

Athenian statesman and general (died 422 BC)

- Κλέων
- Died: 422 BC; Amphipolis
- Military career
- Allegiance: Athens
- Rank: Strategos
- Conflicts: Peloponnesian War: Battle of Sphacteria; Battle of Amphipolis †

Cleon (/ˈkliːɒn/; Ancient Greek: Κλέων Kleon [kléɔːn]; died 422 BC) was an Athenian politician and general (strategos) during the Peloponnesian War. The son of Cleaenetus, a wealthy tanner, Cleon was among the first prominent Athenian politicians of the 5th century BC to obtain power from outside the established elite.

As a political leader, Cleon aligned himself with the poor citizens and emerging commercial class of Athens, while also advocating for an aggressive military strategy against Sparta and its allies. He rose to prominence after the death of Pericles and was subsequently one of the most influential figures in Athenian politics, playing a central role in the Battle of Sphacteria, the Mytilenean Debate, and the failed Athenian campaign to retake Amphipolis in 422 BC, where he was killed.

Cleon was a deeply polarizing figure, portrayed harshly by the two principal contemporary sources on his life - the historian and fellow general at Amphipolis Thucydides and the playwright Aristophanes - both of whom had reasons to personally dislike Cleon. There continues to be an active debate within the historical scholarship regarding Cleon and the fairness of his portrayals by his contemporaries. Some argue that his negative portrayal is due to bias on the part of Thucydides and Aristophanes, while others counter that there is evidence to suggest that their depictions of him were less informed by personal dislike and bias than previously believed. Ultimately, the veracity of Thucydides' and Aristophanes' portrayal of Cleon remains uncertain.

== Political and military career ==
=== Rise to power ===
Cleon emerged as a prominent political figure in Athens during the late 430s BC through his opposition to the military strategy of Pericles. In particular, he criticized Pericles' policy of avoiding battle with the invading Peloponnesian League in 431 BC. Initially, Cleon aligned himself with aristocratic factions opposed to the so-called "leaders of the demos," which included Pericles, Thucydides, Isagoras, Miltiades, Nicias, and Theramenes. In 430 BC, following the failure of Pericles' expedition to the Peloponnese, Cleon led the opposition movement against Pericles' leadership and accused him of mismanaging public funds. While Pericles was found guilty and removed from office, he was quickly reinstated.

The Aegean world on the eve of the Peloponnesian War (431 BC)

Following Pericles' death from the plague in 429 BC, Cleon quickly rose to political prominence. According to Thucydides, by the year 428 BC, Cleon had become the most persuasive speaker in the Athenian Assembly.

Cleon increased his support amongst poorer citizens of Athens by increasing the pay for jury service, which was a source of livelihood for many. His reforms, embrace of Athens' litigious culture, and use of potentially false charges to remove political rivals greatly enhanced his political power and influence.

In 426 BC, Cleon unsuccessfully prosecuted the general Laches due to his supposed hoarding of the wealth gained from an Athenian military expedition to Sicily. He was elected one of the 10 strategoi in 424 BC. Some sources suggest he may have introduced a property tax for military funding, as well as urged the doubling of tribute from allied city-states, however such details remain uncertain and contested.

=== Role in the Peloponnesian War ===
==== Mytilene revolt and debate ====
Map of Greece including sites linked to Cleon's life and campaigns during the Peloponnesian War

In 428 BC the city of Mytilene revolted against Athenian rule, likely spearheaded by the city's rich elite, and appealed to Sparta for military assistance. Although a Spartan fleet was dispatched it failed to arrive before the end of the rebellion. Growing dissatisfaction amongst the Mytilenean populace towards the government resulted in widespread refusal to follow governmental orders. This situation ultimately forced the ruling elite to surrender to Athens, who had sent their own fleet upon hearing of the rebellion, before the Spartan reinforcements could arrive.

Following the surrender, an Assembly session was held to discuss the fate of the city, wherein Cleon advocated for putting to death all of the Mytilenean adult men, while enslaving the women and children. Speaking in opposition to this stance was Diodotus, whose arguments narrowly prevailed and resulted in Cleon's motion being rejected by a slim margin. However, Cleon's proposal was not completely unheeded; the Assembly decided to execute the primary instigators of the rebellion, who numbered roughly around 1,000 and were composed of the city's elite.

==== Battle of Pylos and Sphacteria ====
In the spring of 425 BC, an Athenian fleet decisively defeated a Spartan counterpart in the Battle of Pylos, trapping 400 Spartan soldiers on the island of Sphacteria. Recognizing the severity of the situation, Sparta sent envoys to Athens with offers of peace. However, the Athenians, spurred on by Cleon, believed they held the advantage and could afford to delay in hopes of extracting even more favorable terms from their enemy. Furthermore, at Cleon's urging, the Athenians rejected the Spartan's request to conduct the negotiations in private rather than in front of the whole Assembly. These factors ultimately led to the Spartan envoys concluding that no reasonable settlement could be reached, and they left Athens without securing a peace agreement.

The Athenians began to regret their decisions regarding the peace proposals as conditions of the blockading forces began to deteriorate due to a lack of food and water, which would be greatly exacerbated by the approaching winter. In subsequent Assembly sessions held to discuss the status of the blockade, Cleon claimed that capturing the island from the Spartan garrison should have been an easy task for their generals, and something he would have done if he was in their position. The general Nicias offered to resign his command so that Cleon could takeover, an offer which Cleon accepted, claiming that he would take the island in 20 days. Cleon would fulfill his promise, taking the island in the Battle of Sphacteria. However, due to Cleon's lack of any prior (known) military experience, the general Demosthenes is often credited for the tactical success of the battle.

==== Battle of Amphipolis and death ====
In 422 BC, Cleon was appointed to lead a force sent to retake the city of Amphipolis, which had been lost to the Spartans. However, during the subsequent campaign he was outmaneuvered by the enemy general Brasidas at the Battle of Amphipolis, and was killed by a peltast as his army was routed. However, Brasidas was also slain during the battle, and with his and Cleon's deaths the main opponents to peace on both sides were removed. As such, soon after the Peace of Nicias was signed between Athens and Sparta in 421 BC.

== Historical interpretations ==
=== Contemporary depictions ===
Cleon is portrayed in a highly negative light by both the historian Thucydides and the comic playwright Aristophanes, two of the most prominent contemporary sources on his life. These depictions have significantly shaped his historical reputation, often presenting him as a demagogue and a destabilizing influence in Athenian politics.

Some scholars have noted that these portrayals may reflect a personal dislike and bias against Cleon by Thucydides and Aristophanes. The latter, for instance, had a direct grievance against Cleon, who is said to have made a complaint against Aristophanes for his lost play Babylonians for supposedly slandering the Athenians. Following this, Cleon frequently appeared in Aristophanes' subsequent plays as the target of comedic ridicule.

Thucydides may also have had a reason to hold a personal grudge against Cleon. Thucydides was exiled from Athens for 20 years for failing to prevent the capture of Amphipolis by the Spartan general Brasidas. While Thucydides does not directly name Cleon as being responsible for the decree, the biography Life of Thucydides, directly states that it was the "calumnies" of Cleon that resulted in Thucydides exile. The accuracy of this claim remains uncertain, however, as the biography is dated to sometime between the 2nd and 6th Centuries CE by an unknown author, meaning it was written anywhere from 500 to 1,000 years after the death of Thucydides. Nonetheless, Cleon's role in Thucydides exile is generally accepted in modern historical scholarship.

=== 19th and early 20th century scholarship ===
For a general overview of the literature on Cleon during the 1800 and 1900s, see Karl Friedrich Hermann, Lehrbuch der griechischen Antiquitäten, i. pt. 2 (6th ed. by V. Thumser, 1892), p. 709, and Georg Busolt, Griechische Geschichte, iii. pt. 2 (1904), p. 988, note 3.

Notable early scholarly perspectives are categorized below:

- Favorable:
  - C. F. Ranke, De Aristophanis Vita Commentatio (Leipzig, 1845)
  - J. G. Droysen, Aristophanes, ii., Introd. to the Knights (Berlin, 1837)
  - G. Grote, History of Greece. chs. 50, 54
  - W. Oncken, Athen und Hellas, ii. p. 204 (Leipzig, 1866)
  - H. Müller-Strübing, Aristophanes und die historische Kritik (Leipzig, 1873)
  - J. B. Bury, Hist, of Greece, i. (1902)
- Unfavorable:
  - J. F. Kortüm, Geschichtliche Forschungen (Leipzig, 1863), and Zur Geschichte hellenichen Statsverfassungen (Heidelberg, 1821)
  - F. Passow, Vermischte Schriften (Leipzig, 1843)
  - C Thirlwall, History of Greece, ch. 21
  - E. Curtius, History of Greece (Eng. tr. iii. p. 112)
  - J. Schvarcz, Die Demokratie (Leipzig, 1882)
  - H. Delbrück, Die Strategie des Perikles (Berlin, 1890)
  - E. Meyer, Forschungen zur alten Geschichte, ii. p. 333 (Halle, 1899)
- Balanced:
  - K. J. Beloch, Die attische Politik seit Perikles (Leipzig, 1884), and Griechische Geschichte, i. p. 537
  - A. Holm, History of Greece, ii. (Eng. tr.), ch. 23, with the notes.
  - H. Bengtson, History of Greece: From the Beginnings to the Byzantine Era, Cleon p. 140

=== 21st century scholarship ===
- Aaron Hershkowitz reexamines Cleon's previously posited role in the Athenian financial administration, arguing there is no solid evidence linking him to major fiscal policies such as the property tax known as the eisphora or the Kleonymos and Thoudippos decrees.
- Edith Foster offers insight into the post-Peloponnesian War audience for whom Thucydides was writing, which calls into question previously held notions in modern scholarship regarding Thucydides' bias against Cleon. She emphasizes that this audience would not only have recently "suffered" at the hands of the Athenian politicians Alcibiades and Theramenes, who, like Cleon, were associated with demagoguery, but that by the war's end his earlier victory at Sphacteria would have been "buried in graver defeats of every kind," in the public consciousness. Consequently, Foster challenges the common view that Thucydides' portrayal of Cleon was primarily shaped by personal resentment made to convince the Athenian public of the "rotten" nature of Cleon, as such an opinion likely would have been prevalent already. Furthermore, she suggests that the possibility that Cleon was a genuinely problematic figure, and that Thucydides writings reflect an effort to explain his role in Athens' history to a contemporary audience rather than an effort to convince them of his supposed faults, should be seriously considered.
- Anastasios Nikolaidis reexamines Thucydides' account of the Sphacteria campaign and uses it to challenge the commonly held view that Thucydides' depiction of Cleon reflects a strong bias against him. While acknowledging that Thucydides likely held personally animosity toward Cleon, Nikolaidis argues that this prejudice did not compromise the historian's commitment to factual accuracy. As evidence, he highlights Thucydides' reference to Cleon's claim that he would capture Sphacteria within 20 days as "mad." While earlier scholars have taken this phrasing as proof of Thucydides' bias, Nikolaidis contends that Thucydides' decision to nonetheless record the ultimate success of Cleon's expedition demonstrates a commitment to historical truth that overrides his personal feelings.
