= Battle of Sphacteria =

425 BCE battle between Athens and Sparta, part of the Peloponnesian War

Coordinates: 36°55′48.49″N 21°39′56.61″E

- Part of the Peloponnesian War
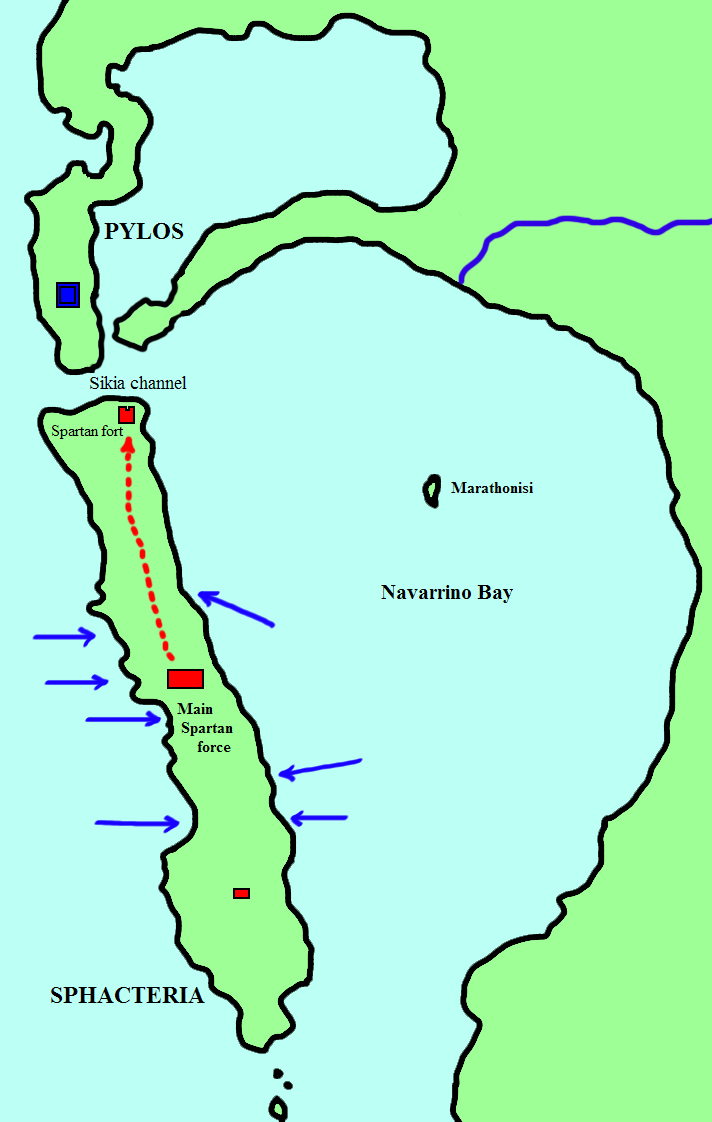
Date	425 BC
Location	Sphacteria, a small island at the entrance to the bay of Pylos
Result	Athenian victory

Belligerents
Athens	Sparta

Commanders and leaders
Demosthenes; Cleon	Epitadas †; Hippagretas; Styphon

Strength
3,000+ soldiers, 8,000 lightly armed rowers	440

Casualties and losses
Few	148 killed, Remainder captured

The Battle of Sphacteria was a land battle of the Peloponnesian War, fought in 425 BC between Athens and Sparta. Following the Battle of Pylos and subsequent peace negotiations, which failed, a number of Spartans were stranded on the island of Sphacteria. An Athenian force under Cleon and Demosthenes attacked and forced them to surrender.

== Overview ==
In the wake of the failed peace negotiations, Demosthenes initially attempted to starve out the Spartans on Sphacteria, but was unable to blockade the island tightly enough. In Athens there was concern that the approach of winter would necessitate abandoning the blockade, unless the impasse was swiftly broken. The politician Cleon took out reinforcements from Athens and joined forces with Demosthenes, and the Athenians launched an assault on Sphacteria. Landing in great force on a weakly defended point, the Athenians swamped the beachfront defenses and moved inland, harassing the Spartans by using bows and spears whenever they attempted to come to grips with the Athenian hoplites. The Spartans retreated to the northern end of the island and dug in behind their fortifications, but when the Messenian general Comon succeeded in bringing his troops through seemingly impassable terrain into their rear, the Spartans surrendered.

The capture of over 292 hoplites (120 of which were Spartans) by Athens radically shifted the balance of power in the war. Athens threatened to execute its prisoners if Sparta invaded Attica, and the annual invasions which had occurred since the war's declaration were thus halted. Athens, meanwhile, with increased prestige and confidence, went on to pursue the war with more vigor and initiative for several years, returning to the negotiating table only after a string of defeats had eroded its position.

== Prelude and early moves ==
After the Battle of Pylos, which resulted in the isolation of over 400 Spartan soldiers on the island of Sphacteria, Sparta sued for peace, and, after arranging an armistice at Pylos by surrendering the ships of the Peloponnesian fleet as security, sent an embassy to Athens to negotiate a settlement. These negotiations, however, proved fruitless, and with the news of their failure the armistice came to an end; the Athenians, however, refused to return the Peloponnesian ships, alleging that assaults had been made against their fortifications during the truce. Hostilities resumed immediately, with the Athenians guarding the island night and day against attempts at rescue or resupply.

Demosthenes, commanding the force at Pylos, initially planned to starve the Spartans out rather than attack them, but as time wore on it became clear that the Spartans would be able to hold out for longer than anticipated. By offering freedom to Helots and monetary rewards to free men who would volunteer to carry food across to the island, the Spartans were able to bring in a small but critical stream of food. Some of these men reached the island by approaching from the seaward side at night during rough weather; others swam underwater towing bags of food. The Athenians, meanwhile, found themselves frequently short on rations, and the entire force was forced to depend on a single spring for its fresh water. In these adverse circumstances, the Athenians began to doubt that they could resolve the issue by siege before winter forced them to lift their blockade.

== Debate at Athens ==
This downturn of fortunes was the source of much concern at Athens, and the decision to reject Sparta's peace offer became an item of popular regret. Noting this turn of popular opinion, Cleon, who had been the principal advocate of rejecting the peace offer, claimed that the reports brought back from the scene must be inaccurate. His political opponent Nicias, a strategos for that year, proposed to send a commission, with Cleon among its members, to verify the reports from Pylos, but Cleon condemned the idea as a waste of time which ought to be spent attacking. Nicias countered this rhetorical thrust by offering to stand aside as a general, and allow Cleon to take command of an expeditionary force to Pylos. Although he had no authority to make this offer, the assembly, caught up in the enthusiasm of the moment, went along with him, urging Cleon to back up his words with action.

Cleon was probably aware that an attack was already being planned at Pylos, as he was likely to have been in communication with Demosthenes, but once he realized that Nicias's offer was more than a rhetorical ploy he attempted to back down from his challenge. The crowd, however, refused to permit this, and Cleon was eventually compelled to accept command. Reassuming the bold attitude he had taken at the start of the debate, Cleon proclaimed that, with the force he had been given, he would either kill or capture the Spartans within twenty days. Naming Demosthenes as his partner in command, he set out from Athens with a force composed of Athenian sailors and ships carrying allied peltasts and archers.

== Attack on Sphacteria ==
Demosthenes had already been planning an attack on Sphacteria, as the difficult living conditions of his army led him to doubt the viability of a prolonged siege. Moreover, Spartan sailors trying to cook a meal outside the crowded confines of Pylos had inadvertently caused a fire which denuded Sphacteria of vegetation, allowing Demosthenes to examine both the contours of the island and the number and disposition of the defenders. Seeing that only thirty Spartans were detailed to guard the southern end of the island, away from Pylos, Demosthenes landed his 800 hoplites on both the seaward and landward sides of the island one night. The Spartan garrison, thinking that the Athenian ships were only mooring in their usual nightly watch posts, was caught off guard and massacred. At dawn, the remainder of the Athenian force streamed ashore; these included some 2,000 light troops (psiloi) and archers (toxotai) and some 8,000 rowers from the fleet, armed with whatever weapons could be found.

The Spartans, under their commander Epitadas, attempted to come to grips with the Athenian hoplites and push their enemies back into the sea, but Demosthenes detailed his lightly armed troops, in companies of about 200 men, to occupy high points and harass the enemy with missile fire whenever they approached. When the Spartans rushed at their tormentors, the light troops, unencumbered by heavy hoplite armor, were easily able to run to safety; dust and ash from the recent fire, stirred up by the commotion, further contributed to the Spartans' predicament by obscuring their attackers from their sight. Unable to make any headway, the Spartans withdrew in some confusion to the northern end of the island, where they dug in behind their fortifications and hoped to hold out. A stalemate took hold for some time, with the Athenians trying unsuccessfully to dislodge the Spartans from their strong positions. At this point, Comon, the commander of the Messenian detachment in the Athenian force, asked Demosthenes for troops to lead through the seemingly impassable terrain along the island's shore. His request was granted, and Comon's men reached the Spartan rear through a route that had been left unguarded on account of its roughness. When he emerged with his force, the Spartans, in disbelief, abandoned their defenses; the Athenians seized the approaches to the fort, and the Spartan force stood on the brink of annihilation.

== Surrender and aftermath ==
At this point, Cleon and Demosthenes declined to push the attack further, preferring to take as many Spartan prisoners as they could. An Athenian herald offered the Spartans a chance to surrender, and the Spartans, throwing down their shields, agreed at last to negotiate. Cleon and Demosthenes met with the Spartan commander Styphon (Styphon had initially been the third in command, but Epitadas had been killed and his first successor was severely wounded and had been left for dead). Styphon requested to send a herald to the mainland to seek advice; the Athenians refused to allow any of the trapped men to leave, but permitted as many heralds from the mainland as were desired to pass back and forth. Several messengers did so, the last of whom left Styphon with the message "The Spartans order you to make your decision yourselves, so long as you do nothing dishonorable." Styphon and his men, with no hope of victory or escape, surrendered. Of the 440 Laconians who had crossed over to Sphacteria, 292 survived to surrender; of these, 120 were men of the elite Spartiate class.

"The outcome," Donald Kagan has observed, "shook the Greek world." Spartans, it had been supposed, would never surrender. Now, with Spartiate hostages in their hands, the Athenians issued an ultimatum; any invasion of Attica would lead to the execution of their prisoners. For the first time since the beginning of the war, the Athenians could farm their crops securely. At Pylos, a Messenian garrison was installed, and these men, launching raids into country that had once been their home, did significant damage to the Spartans and instigated the desertion of numerous Helots. At Athens, Cleon, his seemingly mad promise fulfilled, was the man of the hour; he was granted meals at the state's expense in the prytaneum (the same reward granted to Olympic champions), and most scholars see his hand in the legislation of the following months, the most prominent item of which was an increased levy of tribute on the empire. Sphacteria had changed the nature of the war. The next few years would see a newly aggressive Athens, and it would take a string of Athenian reverses to diffuse the impetus that the surrenders had given and bring the two sides to the table to negotiate the Peace of Nicias in 421 BC.

Thucydides says it was only with victory at the battle of Mantinea in 418 BC that Sparta "did away with all the reproaches that had been levelled against them by the Hellenes, whether for cowardice, because of the disaster on the island, or for incompetence and lack of resolution on other occasions."
