= Adolf Holm =

German historian (1830–1900)

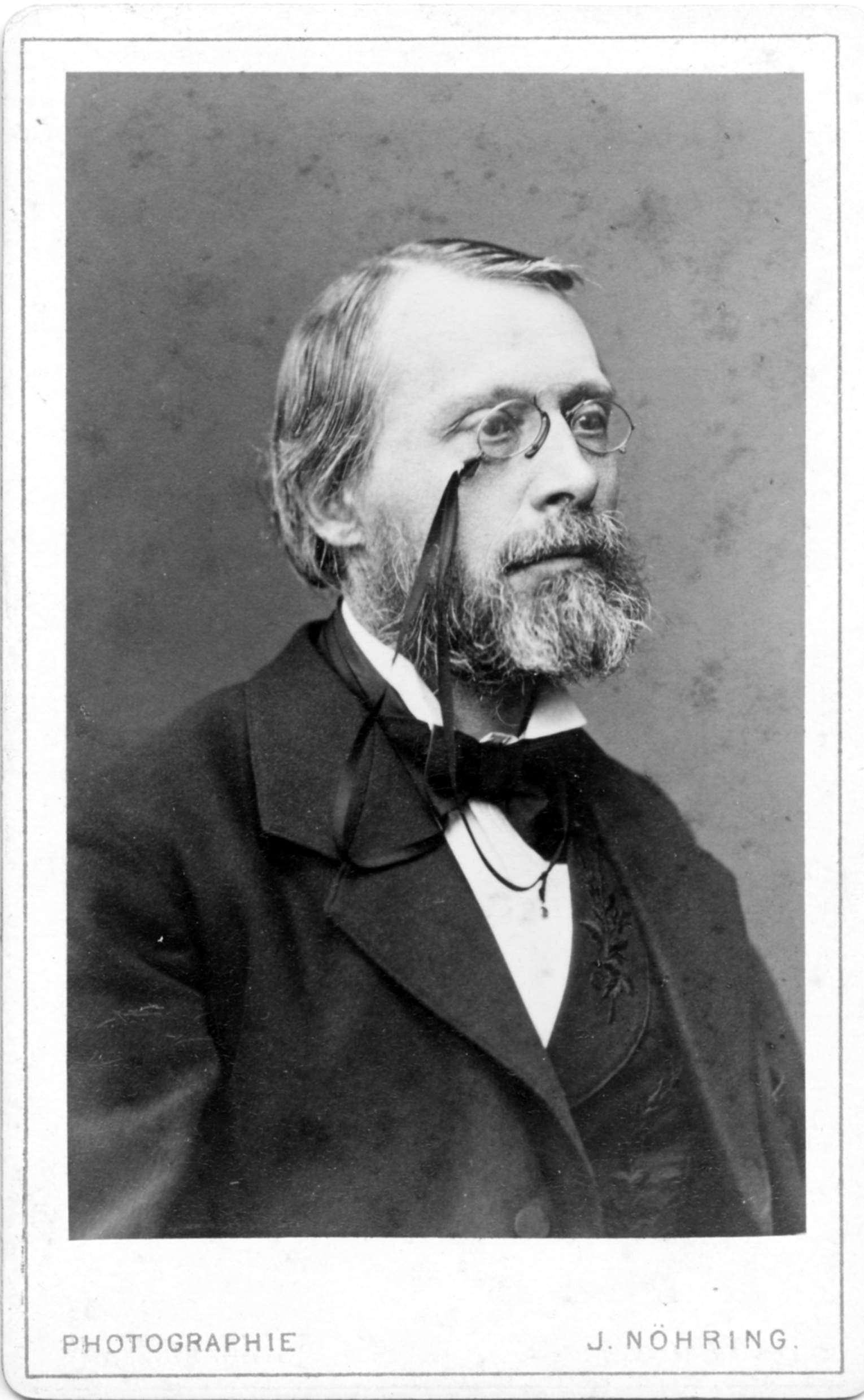
- Adolf Holm in 1870
- Born: August 8, 1830; Lübeck
- Died: June 9, 1900 (aged 69); Freiburg im Breisgau
- Occupation: Historian

Adolf Holm (Lübeck, 8 August 1830 – Freiburg im Breisgau, 9 June 1900) was a German historian of antiquity.

== Biography ==
Adolf Holm was the son of a producer and distributor of tobacco in Lübeck and was born in a house located between Braunstraße and Holstenstraße by the Trave. He studied at Leipzig and Berlin and obtained a doctorate in 1851. Immediately thereafter he was employed by the Katharineum, a grammar school in Lübeck founded in 1531 for the study of ancient languages. He worked on history and geography of ancient Sicily and Greece and wrote a work in several volumes on the History of Sicily in ancient times. At Lübeck he held several conferences with members of the Gesellschaft zur Beförderung gemeinnütziger Tätigkeit (Society for the Furtherance of Charitable Activities) and the Verein für Lübeckische Geschichte und Altertumskunde (Association for Lübeck Historical and Classical Outreach). The collection of plaster casts of ancient sculptures in the cathedral museum was created in large part at his initiative. He was one of the founders of the Verein der Kunstfreunde (Association of Friends of Art) and was its president until he departed for Sicily. Subsequently, he was editor of the Lübeckische Blätter.

In 1876, on account of his publications, he was named Professor Extraordinary of Universal History at the University of Palermo, at the initiative of the Sicilian historian and former Minister of Public Education Michele Amari. There he produced a number of works concerned with the ancient history of Sicily. In 1884 he was invited to take up a post at the University of Naples, where he worked until 1897. He spent the rest of his life in Freiburg im Breisgau.

Reviewing his legacy, Franco De Angelis concludes that "Holm was a product of his time and environment. Like so many German-trained scholars then, he adhered to a positivistic approach, generally avoiding interpretations in favor of collecting evidence. These were immensely useful and pioneering efforts, which some scholars openly acknowledged, and are not without interest to social and economic historians today."

== Works ==
- De ethicis politicorum Aristotelis principiis (On the Central Ethical Themes of Aristotle's Politics), Berlin, 1851
- Antike Geographie Siciliens (Ancient Geography of Sicily), Lübeck, 1866
- Beiträge zur Berichtigung der Karte des alten Siciliens (Contributions to Correction of the Map of Ancient Sicily), Lübeck, 1866
- Geschichte Siciliens im Alterthum (History of Sicily in Antiquity). Vol. 1, 1869; Vol. 2, 1874; Vol. 3, 1897
- Della geografia antica di Sicilia (On the Ancient Geography of Sicily), Palermo, 1871
- Das alte Catania (Ancient Catana), Lübeck, 1873 (Lübeck, Katharineum, Schulprogramm 1873)
- Storia della Sicilia nell'antichità (History of Sicily in Antiquity), Turin, 1896–1901
- Il rinascimento italiano e la Grecia antica: Discorso inaugurale per la riapertura degli studi nell'anno accademico 1880-81 nella Regia Università di Palermo (The Italian Renaissance and Ancient Greece: Inaugural Address for the return to study for the academic year 1880–81 at the Royal University of Palermo), Palermo, 1880
- Topografia archeologica di Siracusa (Archaeological Topography of Syracuse), in collaboration with F.S. Cavallari, Palermo 1883
- Griechische Geschichte von ihrem Ursprunge bis zum Untergange der Selbstständigkeit des griechischen Volkes (Greek History from its Origin to End of the Independence of the Greek People), Berlin, Vol. 1, 1886; Vol. 2, 1889; Vol. 3, 1891; Vol. 4, 1894
- Lübeck, die Freie und Hansestadt (Lübeck, the Free and Hanseatic City), Velhagen & Klasing, 1900.
- Erinnerungen (Memoirs), 1900. Published in excerpts in Der Wagen 1959, pp. 153 – 155 (with commentary by Paul Brockhaus)

== Bibliography ==
- Gerhard Ahrens, "Von Lübeck nach Sizilien: Professore Adolfo Holm (1830-1900)" Zeitschrift des Vereins für Lübeckische Geschichte und Altertumskunde, Vol 87. Verlag Schmidt-Römhild, Lübeck 2007, pp. 135–154
- Karl Christ, "Griechische Geschichte zwischen Adolf Holm und Ettore Lepore" Griechische Geschichte und Wissenschaftsgeschichte, Historia – Einzelschriften, Vol 106. Franz Steiner Verlag, Stuttgart 1996, pp. 144 ff.
- Wilhelm Deecke, Professor Dr. Adolf Holm: ein Erinnerungsblatt zu seinem 70. Geburtstage. Lübeck 1900
