= Brasidas =

5th-century BC Spartan general

- Βρασίδας
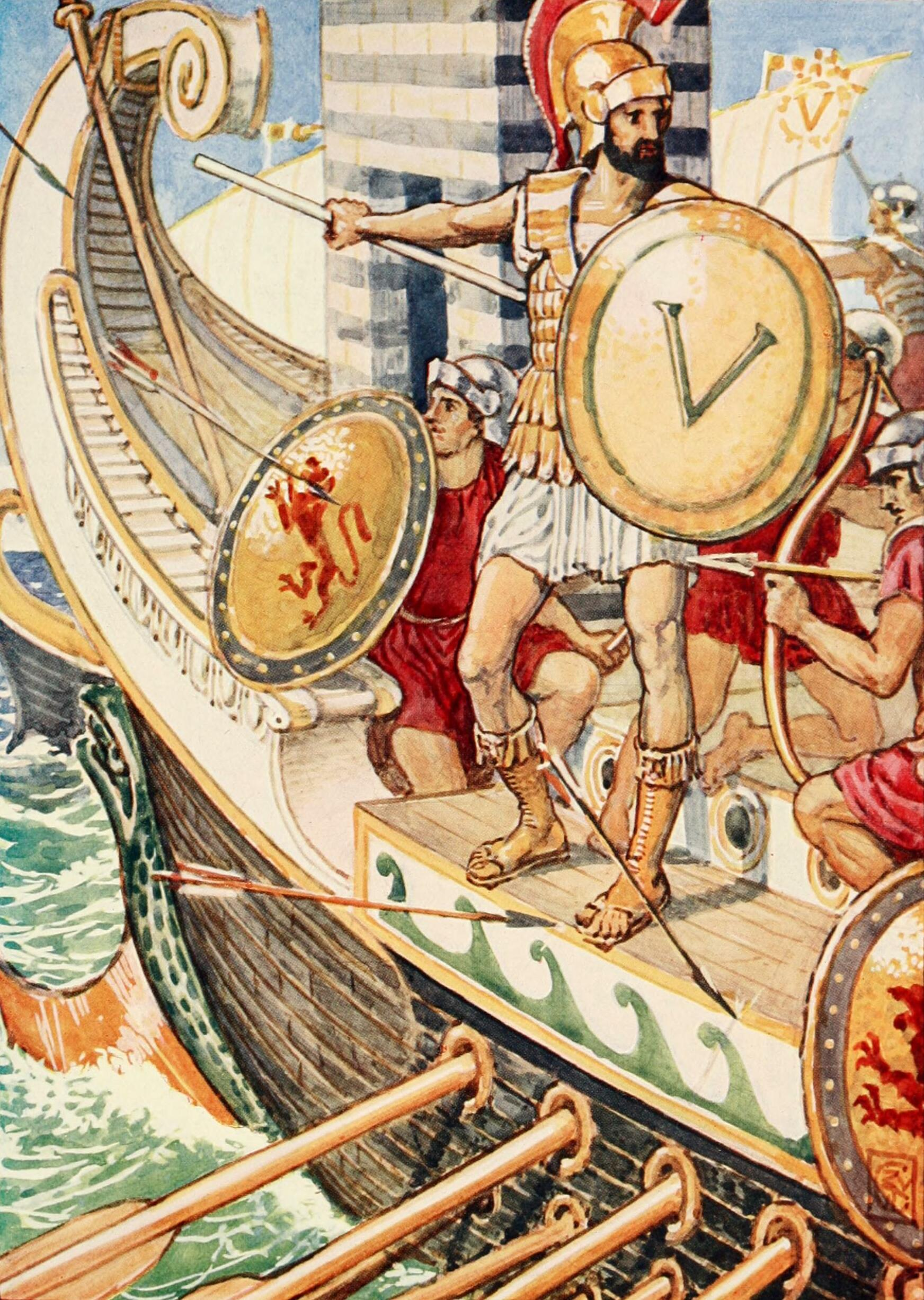
- Brasidas during an assault, as illustrated by Walter Crane.
- Born: Unknown
- Died: 422 BC; Amphipolis
- Burial place: Amphipolis
- Relatives: Argileonis (mother)
- Military career
- Allegiance: Sparta
- Rank: General
- Conflicts: Peloponnesian War: Battle of Naupactus; Battle of Pylos; Battle of Lyncestis; Battle of Megara; Battle of Amphipolis †

Brasidas (Greek: Βρασίδας, died 422 BC) was a Spartan general and statesman and is considered to be the most distinguished Spartan commander of the first decade of the Peloponnesian War. He died during the Second Battle of Amphipolis while winning one of his most spectacular victories.

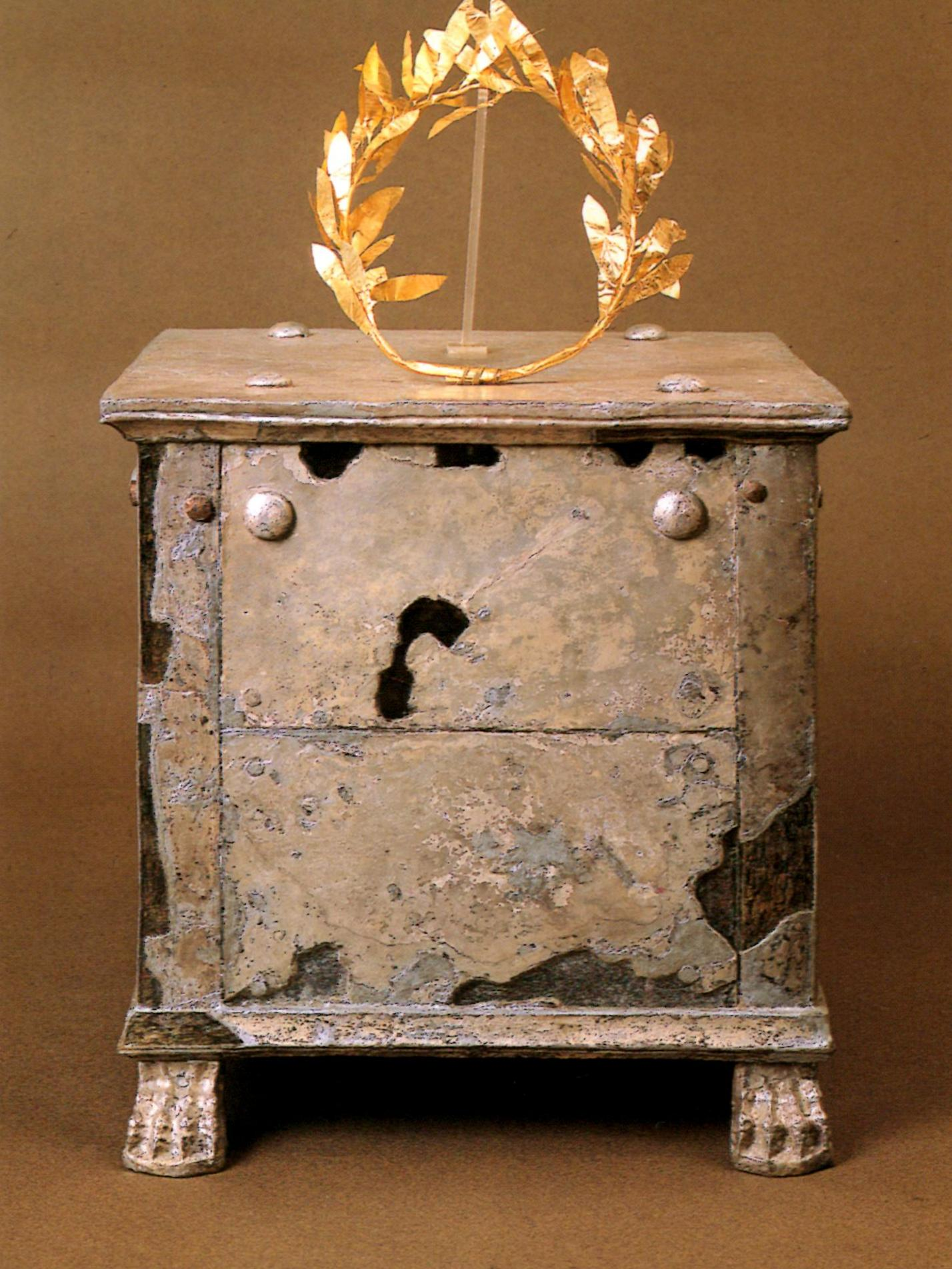
Silver ossuary and gold crown of Brasidas in the Archaeological Museum of Amphipolis.

== Biography ==
Brasidas was the son of Tellis (Τέλλις) and Argileonis, and won his first laurels by leading the relief of Methone, which was besieged by the Athenians (431 BC). During the following year he seems to have been eponymous ephor, and in 429 BC he was sent out as one of the three commissioners to advise the admiral Cnemus. As trierarch he distinguished himself in the assault on the Athenian position at the Battle of Pylos, during which he was severely wounded.

In 424 BC, while Brasidas mustered a force at Corinth for a campaign in Thrace, he frustrated an Athenian attack on Megara. Immediately afterwards he marched through Thessaly at the head of 1,700 hoplites (700 helots and 1000 Peloponnesian mercenaries) and joined Perdiccas II of Macedon. The Macedonian king tried to use the Peloponnesian task force against the Lyncestians, a Macedonian tribe that had fallen out with their king, but Brasidas refused to be made a tool for the furtherance of Perdiccas's ambitions; he ignored the king's objections and received and negotiated with Arrhabaeus, the leader of the Lyncestians.

After he settled with Arrhabaeus, Brasidas set about accomplishing his main objective. Partly by the rapidity and boldness of his movements, partly by his personal charm and the moderation of his demands, he succeeded during the course of the winter in winning over the important cities of Acanthus, Amphipolis (the main objective), Stagirus and Toroni as well as a number of minor towns, and most of the Chalcidic peninsulas. An attack on Eion was foiled by the arrival of Thucydides (the famous historian of the war, who at this time was serving as one of the Athenian generals) at the head of an Athenian squadron. In the spring of 423 BC a truce was concluded between Athens and Sparta, but it was at once imperilled by the city of Scione, which it transpired had come over to Brasidas two days after the truce began, which led to the Athenian requiring it to be returned to them. Brasidas refused to return Scione while encouraging the revolt of Mende shortly afterwards. The Scionians granted Brasidas a golden crown and named him the liberator of Hellas.

An Athenian fleet under Nicias and Nicostratus recovered Mende and blockaded Scione, which fell two years later (421 BC). Meanwhile, Perdiccas forced Brasidas to join him in a campaign against Arrhabaeus and the Lyncestians. They soon met the Lyncestians in a pitched battle and were victorious, driving Arrhabaeus into the mountains. On the approach of a body of Illyrians, who, though summoned by Perdiccas, unexpectedly declared for Arrhabaeus, the Macedonians fled, and Brasidas's force was rescued from a critical position only by his coolness and ability (Battle of Lyncestis). This brought to a head the quarrel between Brasidas and Perdiccas (I.G. i. 42).

In April 422 BC, the truce with Sparta expired, and in the same summer Cleon was dispatched to Thrace, where he stormed Toroni and Galepsus and prepared for an attack on Amphipolis, the most important Athenian subject city in Chalcidice. When Cleon brought part of his army forward to probe the defences, Brasidas recognized an opportunity to defeat his superior force in detail. Brasidas's plan for his final victory was typical of his campaigns in Thrace. It was a boldly aggressive surprise attack aimed at throwing the enemy into confusion and it made the best possible use of both his small force of Spartan hoplites and his allies who made up the bulk of his army, in this case mostly Edonians from the city of Myrkinos.

Brasidas personally led the Spartans in a sudden charge from Amphipolis, routing the left wing of the Athenian army. His allies sallied from the north-eastern gate and attacked from the north, breaking the enemy's right wing. Edonian and Chalcidian cavalry and light infantry pursued the fleeing Athenians, killing 600 men, including Cleon. On the Spartan side only seven fatalities are reported, but one of them was Brasidas, who was mortally wounded while at the head of his Spartan troops. He was buried at Amphipolis within the city limits (an extraordinary honour among the ancient Greeks) with impressive pomp, and was subsequently regarded as the founder (oikistes) of the city and honoured with yearly games and sacrifices. At Sparta a cenotaph was erected in his memory near the tombs of Pausanias and Leonidas, and yearly speeches were made and games celebrated in their honour, in which only Spartiates could compete.

== Legacy ==
Chaido Koukouli-Chrysanthaki, in her three-decade research at Amphipolis, offers evidence of the recovery and identification of Brasidas's burial at the ancient Amphipolis' agora. According to the Greek historian Thucydides, Brasidas's grave was placed in front of the new, relocated agora of Amphipolis. An archaeological dig at Amphipolis unearthed the foundations of a small building, and a cist grave containing the remains of a silver ossuary accompanied by a gold wreath, believed to hold the remains of Brasidas. This ossuary is currently located in the Archaeological Museum of Amphipolis. The grave itself was a hole dug into the existing rock, with limestone blocks and mortar used to create the cist grave.

Thucydides's characterisation of Brasidas suggests that Brasidas combined typical Spartan courage with those virtues in which regular Spartans were most signally lacking. Brasidas was apparently quick in forming his plans and carried them out without delay or hesitation. Furthermore, the rhetoric in the speech of Brasidas to the Acanthians is of noticeably higher quality than the other Spartan speeches recorded by Thucydides (Thuc. iv. 84–89). It appears that Brasidas's un-Spartan virtues raised jealousy and suspicion in Sparta. (See in particular Thucydides; what Diodorus xii. adds is mainly oratorical elaboration or pure invention.)

A fuller account is contained in the histories of Greece (e.g. those of George Grote, Karl Julius Beloch, Georg Busolt, Eduard Meyer) and in Gustav Schimmelpfeng, De Brasidae Spartani rebus gestis atque ingenio (Marburg, 1857).

The Brasideia (βρασίδεια) was an annual festival held in Sparta to honor Brasidas, who was celebrated as a hero after his death. The festival included speeches and athletic contests, which were open only to Spartans. A similar festival was also held in Amphipolis, the people there transferred the title of founder (κτίστης) from Hagnon, the Athenian founder, to Brasidas, who was buried in the city. Amphipolis honored him with heroic rites, including annual sacrifices and contests.

== In popular culture ==
- Brasidas appears in the 2018 video game Assassin's Creed Odyssey. Brasidas is portrayed in the game as a powerful warrior and close friend of the protagonist.
- Brasidas appears in Age of Empires II: Definitive Edition Chronicles expansion as a protagonist for the Spartan side during the Peloponnesian War.
- Brasidas appears in God of War Sons of Sparta as a City Guard at the Sparta's Western Gate, voiced by Jim Pirri. He's described as a veteran of many a war campaign and often mocks the feats of the protagonists in an skeptical and acerbic manner.

== Quotes ==
- "Make no show of cowardice then on your part, seeing the greatness of the issues at stake, and I will show that what I preach to others I can practice myself" (Strassler 307/5.9.10).
- "Not a bad speaker either, for a Spartan" (Thucydides 4.84)
- "He did the Lacedaemonians very great service" (Thucydides 4.81)

== See also ==
- History of the Peloponnesian War
- Gylippus
- Lysander
