= Battle of Pylos =

Naval battle during the Peloponnesian War (425 BC)

- Part of the Peloponnesian War
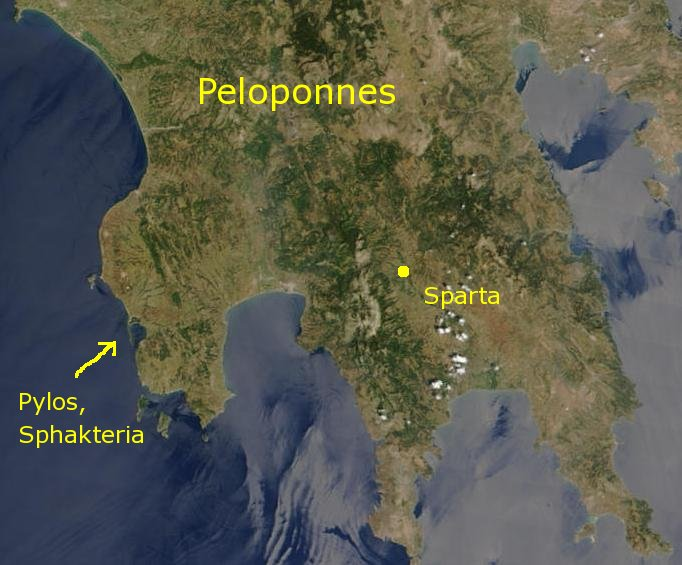
Date	425 BC
Location	Pylos 36°55′N 21°42′E
Result	Athenian victory

Belligerents
Athens	Sparta

Commanders and leaders
Demosthenes	Thrasymelidas; Brasidas (WIA)

Strength
50 ships; 90 hoplites; ~540 light troops	60 ships; Unknown troops

Casualties and losses
8 ships	18 ships 420 hoplites captured

The Battle of Pylos, fought at sea and land, took place in 425 BC during the Peloponnesian War at the peninsula of Pylos, on the present-day Bay of Navarino in Messenia, and was an Athenian victory over Sparta. An Athenian fleet had been driven ashore at Pylos by a storm, and, at the instigation of Demosthenes, the Athenian soldiers fortified the peninsula, and a small force was left there when the fleet departed again. The establishment of an Athenian garrison in Spartan territory frightened the Spartan leadership, and the Spartan army, which had been ravaging Attica under the command of Agis, ended their expedition (the expedition only lasted 15 days) and marched home, while the Spartan fleet at Corcyra sailed to Pylos.

Demosthenes had five triremes and their complements of soldiers as a garrison, and was reinforced by 40 hoplites from a Messenian ship that happened to stop at Pylos. In total, Demosthenes probably had about 600 men, only 90 of which were hoplites. He sent two of his triremes to intercept the Athenian fleet and inform Sophocles and Eurymedon of his danger. The Spartans, meanwhile, had 43 triremes and a large land army. Finding himself thus outnumbered, Demosthenes pulled his remaining three triremes up on land and armed their crews with whatever weapons were at hand. He placed the largest part of his force at the strongly fortified point facing the land. Demosthenes then hand-picked 60 hoplites and a few archers and brought them to the point where he anticipated the Spartans would launch their amphibious assault. Demosthenes expected that the Spartans would hit the south-west corner of the peninsula where the defensive wall was the weakest and the land was most suitable for a landing. The Spartans attacked where Demosthenes had expected, and the Athenians were faced with simultaneous assaults from land and sea. The Athenians held off the Spartans for a day and a half, however, causing the Spartans to cease their attempts to storm Pylos and instead settled in for a siege.

While the Spartans' siege preparations were underway, the Athenian fleet, 50 triremes strong, arrived from Zacynthus. The Spartans failed to blockade the entrance of the harbour, so the Athenians were able to sail in and catch the Spartans unprepared; the Spartan fleet was decisively defeated, and the Athenians gained control of the harbour. In doing so, they trapped 420 Spartan hoplites on the island of Sphacteria, off Pylos. 120 of these were from the Spartiate class, and their peril threw the Spartan government into a panic. Members of the government were dispatched to the scene, and negotiated an armistice on the spot; the entire Spartan fleet was surrendered to the Athenians as a guarantee for Spartan good conduct, and ambassadors were sent to Athens to seek a permanent peace. When these negotiations failed, the Athenians retained possession of the Spartan ships on a pretext, and settled in to besiege the hoplites on Sphacteria; eventually, in the Battle of Sphacteria, those hoplites were captured and taken as hostages to Athens. Pylos remained in Athenian hands, and was used as a base for raids into Spartan territory and as a refuge for fleeing Spartan Helots.

== Prelude ==
In the summer of 425 BC, an Athenian fleet commanded by Eurymedon and Sophocles, with Demosthenes aboard as an advisor, sailed from Athens to campaign in Sicily and assist Athens' democratic allies at Corcyra. Demosthenes held no official position at the time, but was a strategos-elect for the Hellenic year that would begin in midsummer 425, and the two generals had been instructed to allow him to use the fleet around the Peloponnese if he wished. Once the fleet was at sea, Demosthenes revealed his plan, which he had previously kept secret; he wished to land at and fortify Pylos, which he believed to be a particularly promising site for a forward outpost. (Pylos was a good distance from Sparta by march, and commanded an excellent harbour in the Bay of Navarino.). The generals rejected this plan, but Demosthenes caught a stroke of luck when a storm blew and drove the fleet to the shore at Pylos. Even then the generals refused to order the fortification of the promontory, and Demosthenes was similarly rebuffed when he attempted to appeal directly to the troops and subordinate commanders; only when the boredom of waiting out the storm overcame the Athenians did they set to work building fortifications. Once they began, however, the Athenians worked hard and quickly, and the promontory was fortified and defensible within a few days. The fleet sailed off towards Corcyra, where a Spartan fleet of 60 ships was operating, leaving Demosthenes with five ships and their complements of sailors and soldiers to defend the new fort.

The Spartan government was initially unconcerned with the Athenians' presence at Pylos, assuming that they would soon depart. Once it became clear, however, that Demosthenes and his men intended to hold the site, the Eurypontid king of Sparta, Agis, who was at the head of an army ravaging Attica, turned for home, cutting his invasion short after only 15 days in Athenian territory. Once he reached home, Spartan forces immediately moved towards Pylos, the fleet at Corcyra was ordered to sail there immediately, and a summons was sent out calling allied states around the Peloponnese to send troops. The Spartan fleet managed to slip past the Athenian fleet at Zacynthus, but Demosthenes anticipated its arrival and dispatched two of his triremes to inform the Athenian fleet of Pylos' plight; that fleet set out for Pylos as soon as it received the news. Pylos, meanwhile, had been reinforced by the arrival of a privateer with a cargo of arms, which were distributed to the sailors, and by a Messenian pinnace, which brought 40 more hoplites to defend the peninsula. (Donald Kagan has asserted that these apparently fortuitous arrivals must have been the result of planning by Demosthenes.) To meet the imminent Spartan attack, Demosthenes divided his force, placing most of his men at the point where the promontory touched the mainland, while he with 60 hoplites and a few archers waited at the point facing out to sea where the Athenian wall was weakest. When the Spartan fleet arrived, the Spartans prepared to blockade the entrance to the harbour by placing hoplites on the island of Sphacteria, which was in the middle of the entrance, and planned to place ships in the gaps on either side of that island when the Athenian fleet arrived.

== Battle ==
The Spartans assaulted the Athenian fortifications on Pylos from both land and sea. The sea attack came exactly where Demosthenes had expected it would, and he was thus in place to meet it with his men. The landing was difficult at the point of attack, so only a few of the 43 triremes were able to approach the beach at a time. The Spartan captains, following the example of Brasidas, drove their ships into the rocky shore to give their men a chance to disembark and drive the Athenians back, but the defenders refused to give, and repeated waves of attacks failed to break them. The tactic of trying to land troops on a beach facing stiff hoplite resistance was known to be notoriously difficult during this era. These attacks continued for an entire day and then part of the next, but after that the Spartans resigned themselves to a siege and dispatched several ships to bring wood for building siege engines.

On the day after the cessation of attacks, however, the Athenian fleet arrived from Zacynthus. It was too late that day to attack, so the Athenians spent the night on a nearby island, hoping to draw the Spartans out into the open sea to battle. The Spartans refused to take this bait, but the next morning the Athenians sailed in both entrances to the harbour, which the Spartans had failed to block, and quickly routed the Spartan fleet (Donald Kagan has suggested that the Spartans' failure to blockade the entrances indicates that they could not do so, and that their plan was thus fatally flawed from the outset). Pursuit was limited by the size of the harbour, but the Athenians captured some triremes at sea and then landed to attempt to seize the Spartan ships once they reached land. A fierce fight ensued, in which the Athenians were eventually unable to seize more than a few ships, withdrawing after heavy casualties had been suffered by both sides. At the end of the battle, the Athenians controlled the harbour, and were able to sail freely around the island of Sphacteria; they guarded the island closely, ensuring that the hoplites trapped there were unable to escape.

== Aftermath ==
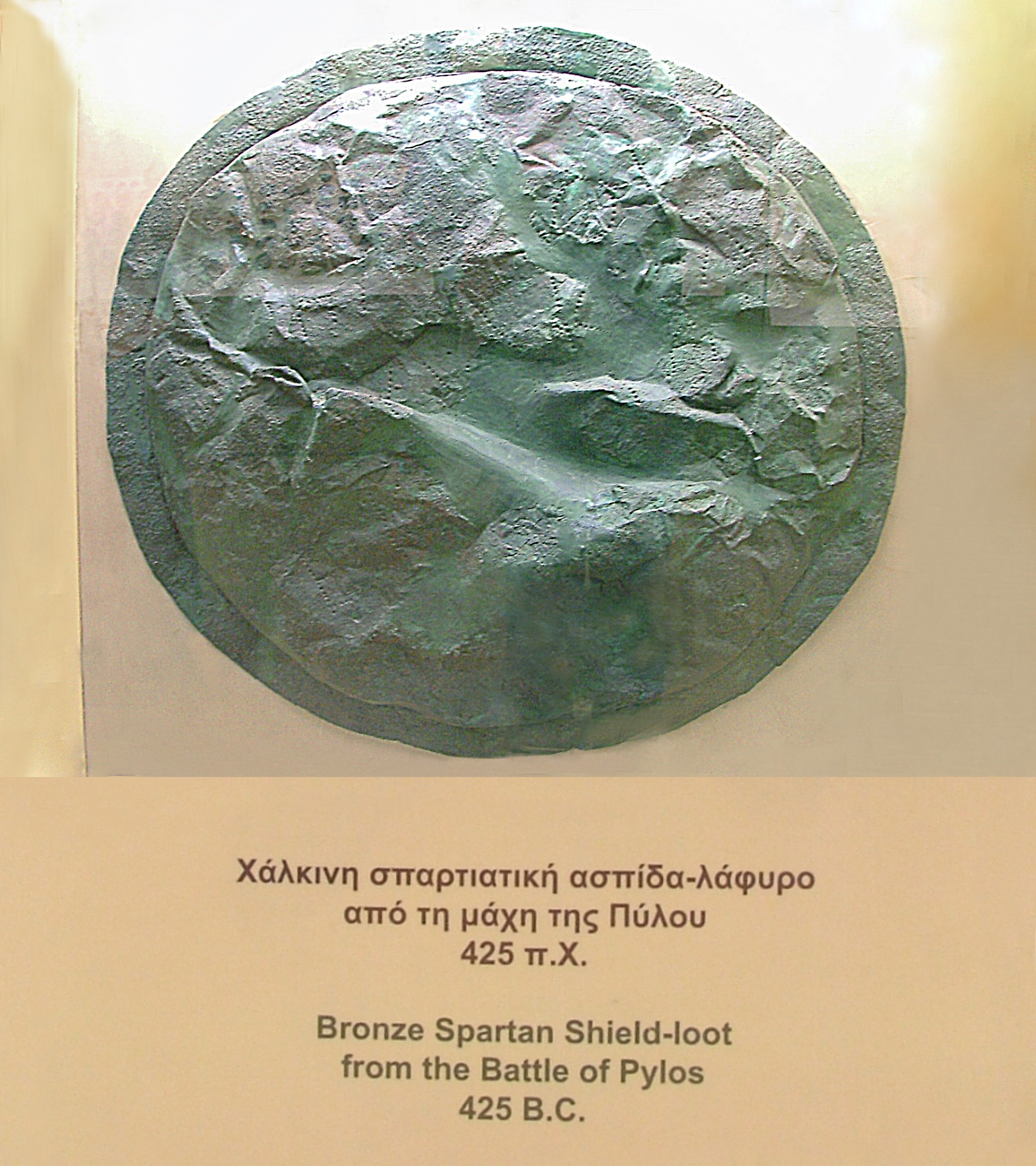
Bronze spartan shield-loot from the Battle of Pylos (425 BC). Ancient Agora Museum.

News of the crisis at Pylos shocked the government of Sparta, and members of the government were immediately dispatched to the scene to negotiate an armistice. This reaction to the potential capture of a mere 420 soldiers may seem extreme, but is explained by the fact that the 120 Spartiates on the island composed probably one tenth of that elite class, on which the Spartan government was based. The Spartan negotiators met with the Athenian generals at Pylos and quickly arranged an immediate cessation of hostilities. The Spartans were permitted to take food to the men on the island, and sent an embassy to Athens immediately to negotiate for a more permanent peace; all the Spartan ships, meanwhile, were surrendered to the Athenians as security for Spartan good conduct.

When the negotiators reached Athens, they made a speech to the Athenian assembly in which they argued that the Athenians should take advantage of the opportunity they had to make peace. The Spartans, they claimed, had suffered a misfortune not through incapacity or overreaching, but through mere bad luck; the Athenians should seize this opportunity to have peace with them on good terms. This proposal, however, met with derision from the Athenian statesman Cleon; he demanded far harsher terms, which would have given Athens control over Megara and compelled Sparta to abandon several important allies. In his speech, he recalled the concessions Athens had been forced to make in the Thirty Years' Peace of 445 BC, when the Athenians had been at a similar momentary disadvantage. Cleon's terms, Donald Kagan has argued, represented a recognition that the Athenians had little to gain from a peace which surrendered the advantage they had just won without impairing the Spartans' ability to make war, while they might secure far better terms in the future by pressing their advantage. When the Spartans asked to discuss these proposals in private, Cleon demanded that they say whatever they had to say in public. By doing so, he guaranteed that the Spartans would be forced to cut off the negotiations (since they could hardly discuss betraying their allies in public), hastening the moment when the Athenians would be free to move against Sphacteria.

The Spartan ambassadors returned home, and the armistice at Pylos came to an end. The Athenians, alleging that the Spartans had violated the terms of the armistice by attacking their wall, refused to hand the Spartan ships back over. Both sides settled in to fight out the fate of the men on Sphacteria; the result would be decided later at the Battle of Sphacteria.
