= 420s BC =

Decade

This article concerns the period 429 BC – 420 BC.

== Events ==
=== 429 BC ===
==== By place ====
====== Greece ======
- The Athenians under Xenophon march into Thrace to attack Chalcis. They destroy crops outside Spartolus and begin negotiating with pro-Athenian factions in Chalcis, but the anti-Athenian factions ask for help from Olynthus. An army from Chalcis, Spartolus, and Olynthus meet the Athenians in battle, but their hoplites are defeated. Reinforcements soon arrive from Olynthus, and they launch a second attack on the Athenians. The Athenians are routed, with all of their generals and 430 other men killed.
- The Athenian admiral Phormio has two naval victories, the Naupactus and the Battle of Rhium at the mouth of the Corinthian Gulf. In the first battle, his 20 ships defeat 47 Corinthian ships commanded by Machaon, Isocrates, and Agatharchidas that were advancing to reinforce the Spartan general, Cnemus's campaign in Acarnania. In the second battle, Phormio routs Cnemus's 77-vessel fleet.
- The Athenians, in alliance with Polichne, destroy the Cretan city of Kydonia.
- The Macedonian king, Perdiccas II, once again betrays the Athenians and sends 1000 troops to support a Spartan assault on Acarnania but they arrive too late to help. In response to this, King Sitalkes of Thrace invades Macedonia with a vast army that includes independent Thracian tribes (such as the Dii) and Paionian tribes (Agrianes and Laeaeans). His progress is slowed when the promised support from Athens fails to materialise. So Perdiccas once again uses diplomacy to ensure the survival of Macedonia. He promises the hand of his sister in marriage to the nephew of Sitalkes, who then persuades Sitalkes to leave Macedonia.
- The plague in Athens that is killing thousands of the city's inhabitants, claims Pericles. Cleon, who has headed the opposition to Pericles's rule, succeeds to power in Athens following Pericles's death.

=== 428 BC ===
==== By place ====
====== Greece ======
- The chief city of Lesbos, Mytilene, revolts against Athenian rule. The Spartan admiral, Alcidas, leads 40 Peloponnesian alliance ships with the aim of assisting the inhabitants of Mytilene. However, the rebellion by Mytilene is crushed before his forces can arrive.
- Despite encouragement from the Ionian leaders to engage the Athenians, Alcidas declines. Rather, Alcidas leads his fleet to Cyllene where the Spartans resolve to strengthen the fleet and send it to Corcyra where a revolution has broken out. Spartan leaders, Brasidas and Alcidas, then defeat a fleet of Corcyran ships. However, they retire when word reaches them that 60 Athenian ships from Leucas under the command of Eurymedon have been dispatched to intercept them.

====== Italy ======
- The Greek colony of Cumae in Italy falls to the Samnites, who begin to take control of the Campanian plain.

==== By topic ====
====== Literature ======
- Euripides' play Hippolytus is performed in the Dionysia competition, the famous Athenian dramatic festival. The play is awarded first prize.
- Sophocles writes Oedipus Rex.

=== 427 BC ===
==== By place ====
====== Greece ======
- Aristophanes produces Daitaleis (The Banqueters)
- Sparta's King Archidamus II is succeeded by his son Agis II.
- Following the surrender of Mytilene to Athens, the Athenian leader Cleon insists that the city be destroyed. In response to the pleadings of a number of Athenian citizens, Cleon's decree to destroy the population of Mytilene is reversed with only the ringleaders of the Mytilenean revolt being executed.
- Plataea surrenders to the Spartans and Thebans after its garrison comes close to death from starvation. Over 200 prisoners are put to death and Plataea is destroyed.
- The civil war in Corcyra, in which the Athenians and the Spartans have interfered ineffectually, results in a victory of the democrats (who support an alliance with Athens) over the oligarchs.
- In an effort to blockade Sparta from access to Sicilian corn, Athens responds to a plea for help from a delegation from the city of Leontini led by Gorgias, the sophist and rhetorician. Leontini is being threatened by Syracuse which is allied to Sparta. However, the Athenian mission led by the Athenian general Laches is unable to offer much help. Laches is later prosecuted by Cleon for his unsuccessful mission to support Athenian interests in Sicily.

====== Roman Republic ======
- The Quaestorship is opened to the Plebs.

=== 426 BC ===
==== By place ====
====== Greece ======
- The Athenian leader Cleon and Athenian general Demosthenes revitalise the city's military and naval forces despite opposition from Nicias, a rich merchant and soldier, and his supporters.
- Demosthenes unsuccessfully besieges the Corinthian colony of Leukas. As a result, he does not return to Athens, fearing for his life. However when, later in the year, Ambracia invades Acarnania, and the Acarnanians seek help from Demosthenes, who is patrolling the Ionian Sea coast with twenty Athenian ships, he reaches the Athenian naval base in the Gulf of Corinth at Naupactus and secures it just in time to defend it against a large Spartan army from Delphi under Eurylochus which has come to assist the Ambraciots. Demosthenes defeats the Spartan army and Eurylochus is killed during the Battle of Olpae. The Acarnanians and Ambraciots then sign a peace treaty.
- An Athenian army under Nicias, Hipponicus and Eurymedon defeats a combined Tanagran and Theban army in the Battle of Tanagra.

=== 425 BC ===
==== By place ====
====== Persian Empire ======
- Artaxerxes I, Achaemenid king of Persia, is succeeded by his son Xerxes II.

====== Greece ======
- Aristophanes produces the comedy, Archanians.
- Demosthenes captures and fortifies the port of Pylos in the Peloponnesus, giving Athens a strong base close to Sparta. Meanwhile, a Spartan army, commanded by Brasidas, lands on the nearby island of Sphacteria, but is repulsed by the Athenians. An Athenian fleet summoned by Demosthenes bottles up the Spartan navy in Navarino Bay.
- Cleon joins Demosthenes in the invasion by Athenian troops of Sphacteria. The resulting Battle of Pylos results in an Athenian victory leading to the surrender of many of the Spartan troops. Pylos remains in Athenian hands, and is used as a base for raids into Spartan territory and as a refuge for fleeing Spartan helots.
- Following the failure of peace negotiations between Athens and Sparta, a number of Spartans stranded on the island of Sphacteria after the Battle of Pylos are attacked by an Athenian force under Cleon and Demosthenes. The resulting Battle of Sphacteria leads to a further victory by the Athenians over the Spartans. The Spartans sue for peace, but the Athenian leader Cleon persuades Athens to refuse.

====== China ======
- Zhou wei lie wang becomes king of the Zhou dynasty of China.

==== By topic ====
====== Architecture ======
- Callicrates starts to build the Temple of Athena Nike on the Acropolis in Athens (approximate date). Between 410 and 407 BC the temple is surrounded by a parapet.

====== Art ======
- What some historians call the Rich style begins in Greece.

====== Literature ======
- Euripides' play Hecuba is performed.
- Aristophanes' play The Acharnians is performed. Produced by Callistratus, it wins Aristophanes a first prize at the Lenaea.

=== 424 BC ===
==== By place ====
====== Persian empire ======
- Xerxes II rules as King of Persia for only about 45 days until he is killed. He is reportedly murdered, while drunk, by Pharnacyas and Menostanes on the orders of Sogdianus, the son of one of Artaxerxes I's concubines, Alogyne of Babylon.

====== Greece ======
- At the Congress of Gela, the statesman Hermocrates of Syracuse persuades the cities of Sicily to agree to make peace and urges the exclusion of foreign powers. As a result, the three-year war between his city and Sicily's pro-Athenian town ends and the Athenian forces, which had been sent to Sicily to support Greek settlements, are forced to withdraw.
- Demosthenes and Hippocrates attempt to capture Megara, but they are defeated by the Spartans under their general Brasidas. Demosthenes then marches to Naupactus to assist in a democratic revolution, and to gather troops for an invasion of Boeotia. However, Demosthenes and Hippocrates are unable to coordinate their attacks and Hippocrates is defeated at the Battle of Delium by Pagondas of Thebes. During the battle, Socrates is said to have saved the life of Alcibiades. Demosthenes attacks Sicyon and is defeated as well.
- After he frustrates the Athenian attack on Megara, Brasidas marches through Boeotia and Thessaly to Chalcidice at the head of 700 helots and 1000 Peloponnesian mercenaries to join the Macedonian king Perdiccas II. Refusing to be made a tool for the furtherance of Perdiccas' ambitions, Brasidas wins over the important cities of Acanthus, Stagirus, Amphipolis, and Torone as well as several minor towns. An attack on Eion is foiled by the arrival of Thucydides at the head of an Athenian squadron.
- Brasidas' capture of the city of Amphipolis is a major reverse for Athens, for which the Athenian general (and future historian) Thucydides is held responsible and banished. This gives Thucydides the opportunity for undistracted study for his History and travel and wider contacts, especially on the Peloponnesian side (Sparta and its allies).
- Nicias captures the Peloponnesian island of Cythera, from which to harry the Spartans.
- Aristophanes produces the comedy, Knights

==== By topic ====
====== Architecture ======
- The temple to Athena Nike (also known as the Wingless Victory) on the Athenian Acropolis is completed. It has been designed by the Athenian architect Callicrates.

=== 423 BC ===
==== By place ====
====== Persian empire ======
- Ochus, satrap of Hyrcania and son of Artaxerxes I and a Babylonian concubine, seizes the Persian throne from his half brother Secydianus (or Sogdianus), whom he has executed. The new king rules as Darius II.

====== Greece ======
- The Athenian general, Laches, successfully moves in the Athenian Assembly for an armistice with Sparta to check the progress of Sparta's most effective general, Brasidas. However, the "Truce of Laches" has little impact on Brasidas and collapses within a year.
- Brasidas ignores the proposed year-long truce and proceeds to take Scione and Mende in the hope of reaching Athens and freeing Spartan prisoners. Athens sends reinforcements under Nicias who retakes Mende.

====== Rome ======
- Gaius Sempronius Atratinus and Quintus Fabius Vibulanus are elected as consuls
- Sextus Tempanius, Aulus Sellius, Sextus Antistius, and Spurius Icilius are chosen by the commons as tribunes

==== By topic ====
====== Drama ======
- Aristophanes' play The Clouds is performed as is Sophocles' play Maidens of Trachi and The Putine (The Bottle), by Cratinus.

=== 422 BC ===
==== By place ====
====== Greece ======
- Athenian leader, Cleon, ends the truce between Athens and Sparta after he resolves to rescue the town of Amphipolis in Macedonia. However, through skillful generalship by Brasidas, the Spartans rout the Athenians in the Battle of Amphipolis. Both Brasidas and Cleon are killed in the battle, thereby removing the key members of the pro-war factions on both sides.
- Alcibiades takes over the leadership of the pro-war party in Athens.

==== By topic ====
====== Drama ======
- Aristophanes' play The Wasps is performed.

=== 421 BC ===
==== By place ====
====== Greece ======
- Nicias, the leader of the aristocratic and peace party in Athens and Pleistoanax, King of Sparta, negotiate the Peace of Nicias between Athens and Sparta, which brings a temporary end to the Peloponnesian War. The essence of the Peace of Nicias is a return to the antebellum period with most wartime gains being returned. Seventeen representatives from each side swear an oath to uphold the treaty, which is meant to last for one generation (30 years: meaning they are not responsible for the next generation's decision). All of Sparta's allies agree to sign the peace except for the Boeotians, Corinth, Elis, and Megara.
- Alcibiades engineers an anti-Spartan alliance between Athens and the democracies of Argos, Mantinea and Elis.

====== Italy ======
- The city of Cumae, the most northerly of the Greek colonies in Italy, falls to the Samnites.

==== By topic ====
====== Art ======
- The construction of the Porch of the Maidens (the Caryatid Porch) commences at the Erechtheion which is part of the Acropolis in Athens.

====== Drama ======
- Aristophanes' play Peace is performed.

=== 420 BC ===
==== By place ====
====== Greece ======
- The young and popular Alcibiades is elected "Strategos" (one of a board of ten generals) and begins to dominate Athenian life and politics. A Quadruple Alliance of Athens, Argos, Mantineia and Elis, which has been organised by Alcibiades (in opposition to Nicias) confronts a Spartan-Boeotian alliance.
- Around 420 BC, Spartans were excluded from participating in the Olympic Games due to their ongoing conflicts with other Greek city-states, violating a peace treaty. This exclusion was part of a broader effort to maintain the peaceful atmosphere of the games.

==== By topic ====
====== Drama ======
- Euripides' play The Suppliant Women is performed.
- Euripides' play Phaethon is performed.

== Births ==
429 BC

- Ateas, king of Scythia (d. 339 BC)

428 BC

- Archytas, Greek philosopher, mathematician, astronomer, statesman, and strategist (d. 347 BC)

427 BC

- Plato, Greek philosopher (d. c. 347 BC)

425 BC

- Artaxerxes III, king of the Persian Empire (approximate date)

== Deaths ==
429 BC

- Pericles, Athenian statesman (epidemic) (born c. 495 BC)

428 BC

- Anaxagoras, Greek philosopher (b. c. 500 BC)

427 BC

- Archidamus II, king of Sparta

426 BC

- Eurylochus, Spartan general (killed in battle)
- Zhou kao wang, king of the Zhou dynasty of China

425 BC

- Artaxerxes I, king of the Persian Empire
- Herodotus of Halicarnassos, Dorian Greek historian (b. 484 BC)

424 BC

- The Achaemenid king Artaxerxes I and his wife Damaspia
- Xerxes II, King of Persia.

423 BC

- Sogdianus, King of Persia (assassinated)

422 BC

- Brasidas, Spartan general
- Cleon, Athenian politician and general

421 BC

- Cratinus, Greek comedy author (approximate date) (b. 520 BC)

420 BC

- Protagoras, Greek presocratic philosopher (b. c. 490 BC)
