= Aetolian campaign =

Military campaign during the Peloponnesian War (426 BC)

- Part of the Peloponnesian War
| Date | 426 BC |
| Location | Aetolia |
| Result | Aetolian victory |

Belligerents
| Athens; Naupactus; Cephallonia; Zacynthus | Aetolian tribal forces |

Commanders and leaders
| Demosthenes, Procles † | Unknown |

Strength
| 2,500 | 3,000 |

Casualties and losses
| Severe; 120 of 300 Athenians, unknown for other allies | Relatively few |

The Aetolian campaign, often referred to as "Demosthenes' Aetolian campaign", was a failed Athenian offensive in northwestern Greece during the Archidamian War. In 426 BCE, Demosthenes was dispatched from Athens to the Corinthian Gulf in command of a fleet of 30 ships. Arriving in the north-west, he quickly assembled a coalition force from Athens' allies in the region and besieged the city of Leucas. However, before the siege reached a conclusion, he was persuaded to abandon it in favour of an attack on the tribal region of Aetolia. Leaving Leucas, he set out towards Aetolia, losing along the way several major contingents from his army, whose leaders were apparently unhappy with his change in strategy.

At first, the invasion met with little resistance, and several towns fell easily. But, before long, an effective Aetolian force was gathered by summoning tribesmen from throughout the region. Demosthenes, meanwhile, having alienated his Acarnanian allies and failing to rendezvous as scheduled with reinforcements from Locris, was critically short of the peltasts (spear throwers) whose range and mobility could have proved decisive in the rough terrain of Aetolia. After seizing the town of Aegitium, Demosthenes's army came under heavy attack from the surrounding high ground and was driven into a retreat that soon became a rout. A great number of his men perished, and any notion of taking Aetolia had to be abandoned. The battle emboldened Sparta's allies in the region, and lasting damage to Athenian interests was only avoided through a tactically brilliant defence of Naupactus and Acarnania (which fully restored Demosthenes' military reputation).

== Prelude ==
In the summer of 426 BC, Athens, having ended the immediate threat to its security by quashing the Mytilenean revolt in the previous year, took a more aggressive stance than in previous campaigning seasons. A major fleet of 60 ships, commanded by Nicias, was sent to attack first Melos and then Boeotia (resulting in the Battle of Tanagra). Demosthenes and Procles, meanwhile, with a fleet of half that size, were dispatched to round the Peloponnese and operate in the north-west and the Corinthian Gulf. Upon its arrival in the northwestern theatre, this relatively small Athenian force was substantially augmented by the addition of Messenian hoplites from Naupactus, 15 Corcyraean ships, a great number of Acarnanian soldiers, and smaller contingents from a number of Athens' other allies in the region. With this formidable force, Demosthenes fell upon and destroyed a garrison of Leucadian troops, then attacked and blockaded the city of Leucas itself. Leucas was a significant Peloponnesian base in the region, and the Acarnanians enthusiastically advocated besieging and taking the city. Demosthenes, however, chose instead to follow the advice of the Messenians, who wished to attack and subdue the tribal region of Aetolia, which they asserted was threatening Naupactus.

Thucydides notes that Demosthenes made this decision partly to please his Messenian allies, but also states that he also wished to, if possible, pass through Aetolia, increase his army on the march by adding to it the men of Phocis, and attack Boeotia from the lightly defended western approach. Furthermore, as Nicias was simultaneously engaging in operations in eastern Boeotia, Demosthenes may have considered the possibility of forcing the Boeotians to fight on two fronts. Accordingly, he pulled up stakes at Leucas and set out for Aetolia. Before he arrived there, however, his force was appreciably diminished by the departure of several major contingents. The Acarnanians, upset that their preferred strategy of taking Leucas had been spurned, returned to their home country, and the Corcyraean ships also departed (apparently out of unwillingness to participate in an operation that offered their city no clear benefits).

== Campaign ==
If Demosthenes was daunted by these significant breaches in his coalition, he did not reveal it through his immediate actions. Establishing a base at the city of Oeneon in Locris, he began an advance into Aetolia, after making plans to rendezvous with a Locrian force in the Aetolian interior. His army advanced successfully for three days, reaching the town of Tichium on the third day. Here, Demosthenes called a halt while the plunder captured up to that point was transported back to his base. Some modern scholars have also suggested that the Locrian force that Demosthenes had planned to meet up with had been scheduled to join him at or before Tichium, and that his delay there was in part caused by his concern over their absence. The Locrians practised a style of warfare similar to that of their Aetolian neighbours, and could have provided Demosthenes with skilled javelin throwers. In their absence, the Athenian-led force was critically deficient in light missile troops, where its opponents were strongest.

Nonetheless, his confidence bolstered by the Messenians, who assured him that the element of surprise would guarantee success as long as he continued to strike before the Aetolians had a chance to combine their forces against him, Demosthenes continued inland. The Messenians' advice, however, was already out of date. The Aetolians had learned of Demosthenes' plans even before he invaded, and by this time they had assembled a substantial force from throughout the region. Demosthenes advanced to the town of Aegitium, which he took easily, but he would go no further. The inhabitants of Aegitium retreated to the hills around the town, where they joined the main Aetolian army, and soon Demosthenes' force came under assault from the surrounding high ground.

Moving with relative ease over the rough terrain, the Aetolian javelin throwers were able to fling their weapons and retreat easily before the heavily encumbered Athenian hoplites could reach them; without the Locrians, Demosthenes could rely only on a contingent of archers to keep the Aetolian skirmishers at bay. Even with the archers defending them, the Athenians were receiving the worst of the struggle; when the captain of the archers was killed, his men scattered, and the rest of the army shortly followed them. A bloodbath ensued. Demosthenes' co-commander Procles was killed, as was his Messenian guide. Leaderless troops of fleeing soldiers raced into exit-less dry canyons or became lost on the battlefield, while the fast moving Aetolians cut them down; the largest escaping contingent became lost in a forest, which was then set on fire around them. 120 of the 300 Athenians who had marched with Demosthenes were killed; casualties among the allies are not known, but were presumably of a similar order. Such losses were particularly exorbitant when contrasted with the toll of a traditional hoplite battle, in which casualty rates of over 10% were highly unusual.

== Aftermath ==
After returning to Naupactus, the defeated Athenian force sailed for home, leaving behind it a newly precarious strategic situation and a commander with a severely shaken reputation; the Aetolians were emboldened by their victory and began preparing for an offensive against Naupactus, and Demosthenes was so concerned about his potential reception in Athens (where the assembly was known to deal harshly with disgraced generals) that he chose not to return home with his fleet. In the upcoming months, however, the strategic situation would be stabilised and Demosthenes' reputation restored by his spectacular victory at Olpae.
