= 426 BC =

426 BC in various calendars
- Gregorian calendar: 426 BC; CDXXVI BC
- Ab urbe condita: 328
- Ancient Egypt era: XXVII dynasty, 100
- Pharaoh: Artaxerxes I of Persia, 40
- Ancient Greek Olympiad (summer): 88th Olympiad, year 3
- Assyrian calendar: 4325
- Balinese saka calendar: N/A
- Bengali calendar: −1019 – −1018
- Berber calendar: 525
- Buddhist calendar: 119
- Burmese calendar: −1063
- Byzantine calendar: 5083–5084
- Chinese calendar: 甲寅年 (Wood Tiger); 2272 or 2065 — to — 乙卯年 (Wood Rabbit); 2273 or 2066
- Coptic calendar: −709 – −708
- Discordian calendar: 741
- Ethiopian calendar: −433 – −432
- Hebrew calendar: 3335–3336
- Hindu calendars
- Vikram Samvat: −369 – −368
- Shaka Samvat: N/A
- Kali Yuga: 2675–2676
- Holocene calendar: 9575
- Iranian calendar: 1047 BP – 1046 BP
- Islamic calendar: 1079 BH – 1078 BH
- Javanese calendar: N/A
- Julian calendar: N/A
- Korean calendar: 1908
- Minguo calendar: 2337 before ROC 民前2337年
- Nanakshahi calendar: −1893
- Thai solar calendar: 117–118
- Tibetan calendar: ཤིང་ཕོ་སྟག་ལོ་ (male Wood-Tiger) −299 or −680 or −1452 — to — ཤིང་མོ་ཡོས་ལོ་ (female Wood-Hare) −298 or −679 or −1451

Year 426 BC was a year of the pre-Julian Roman calendar. At the time, it was known as the Year of the Tribunate of Cincinnatus, Albinus, Fusus and Cossus (or, less frequently, year 328 Ab urbe condita). The denomination 426 BC for this year has been used since the early medieval period, when the Anno Domini calendar era became the prevalent method in Europe for naming years.

== Events ==
=== By place ===
==== Greece ====
- The Athenian leader Cleon and Athenian general Demosthenes revitalise the city's military and naval forces despite opposition from Nicias, a rich merchant and soldier, and his supporters.
- Demosthenes unsuccessfully besieges the Corinthian colony of Leukas and does not return to Athens, fearing for his life. Later in the year, when Ambracia invades Acarnania, the Acarnanians seek his assistance. Demosthenes, who is patrolling the coast of the Ionian Sea with twenty Athenian ships, reaches the Athenian naval base at Naupactus in the Gulf of Corinth. He helps defend the area against a Spartan army under Eurylochus, which has come to assist the Ambraciots. Demosthenes defeats the Spartan forces at the Battle of Olpae, where Eurylochus is killed. The Acarnanians and Ambraciots subsequently conclude a peace treaty.
- An Athenian army under Nicias, Hipponicus and Eurymedon defeats a combined Tanagran and Theban army in the Battle of Tanagra.

== Deaths ==
- Eurylochus, Spartan general (killed in battle)
- Zhou kao wang, king of the Zhou dynasty of China
