= Amphilochian Argos =

Town of ancient Amphilochia

Amphilochian Argos (Ancient Greek: Ἄργος τὸ Ἀμφιλοχικόν, Latin: Argos Amphilochicum) was the chief town of ancient Amphilochia, situated at the eastern extremity of the Ambraciot Gulf, on the river Inachus. Its territory was called Argeia (Ἀργεία).

== Foundation legend ==
Its inhabitants laid claim to their city having been colonized from the celebrated Argos in Peloponnesus, though the legends of its foundation somewhat differed. It was, according to one tradition, founded by Amphilochus, son of Amphiaraüs, after the Trojan War. Amphilochus, being dissatisfied with the state of things in Argos on his return from Troy, emigrated from his native place, and founded a city of the same name on the Ambraciot Gulf and the whole region of Amphilochia. According to another tradition, it was founded by Alcmaeon, who called it after his brother Amphilochus.

== History ==
Whether the city owed its origin to an Argive colony or not, we know that the Amphilochi were regarded by Thucydides as “barbarians” at the commencement of the Peloponnesian War, and that shortly before that time the inhabitants of Amphilochian Argos were the only portion of the Amphilochi, who had become “Hellenized” regarding their speech. He contrasts the “Greek Ambrakiotes” with the “barbarian Amphilochians”, but he leaves no doubt that the criterion on which their distinction is based is language, and perhaps culture. Thucydides also claims that they became hellenized, and they owed that to some colonists from Ambracia, whom they admitted into the city to reside along with them. According to him, “at that time they [the inhabitants of Amphilochian Argos] first became hellenized, regarding their present language, by their Ambraciot fellow settlers.” He had similar views of the neighboring Aetolians and Acarnanians, even though the evidence leaves no doubt that they were Greek. The term “barbarian” may have denoted not only clearly non-Greek populations, but also Greek populations on the fringe of the Greek world with peculiar dialects.

Nevertheless, the Ambraciots, soon expelled the original inhabitants, and kept the town, with its territory, exclusively for themselves. The expelled inhabitants placed themselves under the protection of the Acarnanians, and both people applied to Athens for assistance. The Athenians accordingly sent a force under Phormio, who took Argos, sold the Ambraciots as slaves, and restored the town to the Amphilochians and Acarnanians, both of whom now concluded an alliance with Athens. This event probably happened in the year before the Peloponnesian War, 432 BCE.

It took an active part on the Athenian side during the Peloponnesian War in alliance with its neighbours the Acarnanians against the Ambraciots and Leucadians, who were supported by their mother city, Corinth, and the Peloponnesian League. In 430 BCE the Ambraciots, anxious to recover the lost town, marched against Argos, but were unable to take it, and retired, after laying waste its territory. In 426 BCE they made a still more vigorous effort to recover Argos. The Ambraciots having received the promise of assistance from Eurylochus, the Spartan commander, who was then in Aetolia, marched with 3000 hoplites into the territory of Argos, and captured the fortified hill of Olpae (Ὄλπαι), close upon the Ambracian gulf, 25 stadia (about 3 miles or 5 km) from Argos itself. Thereupon the Acarnanians marched to the protection of Argos, and took up their position at a spot called Crenae (Κρῆναι), or 'the Wells', at no great distance from Argos. Meantime Eurylochus, with the Peloponnesian forces, had marched through Acarnania, and had succeeded in joining the Ambraciots at Olpae, passing unperceived between Argos itself and the Acarnanian force at Crenae. He then took post at Metropolis (Μητρόπολις), a place probably northeast of Olpae.

Demosthenes, who had been invited by the Acarnanians to take the command of their troops, shortly afterward arrived in the Ambraciot Gulf with 20 Athenian ships, and anchored near Olpae. Having disembarked his men, and taken the command, he encamped near Olpae. The two armies were separated only by a deep ravine: and as the ground was favourable for ambush, Demosthenes hid some men in a bushy dell, so that they might attack the rear of the enemy. The stratagem was successful, Demosthenes gained a decisive victory, and Eurylochus was slain in the battle. This victory was followed by another still more striking.

The Ambraciots at Olpae had some days before sent to Ambracia, to beg for reinforcements; and a large Ambraciot force had entered the territory of Amphilochia about the time when the Battle of Olpae was fought. Demosthenes being informed of their march on the day after the battle, formed a plan to surprise them in a narrow pass above Olpae. At this pass there were two conspicuous peaks, called respectively the greater and the lesser Idomene (Ἰδομένη). The lesser Idomene seems to have been at the northern entrance of the pass, and the greater Idomene at the southern entrance. As it was known that the Ambraciots would rest for the night at the lower of the two peaks, ready to march through the pass the next morning, Demosthenes sent forward a detachment to secure the higher peak, and then marched through the pass in the night.

The Ambraciots had obtained no intelligence of the defeat of their comrades at Olpae, or of the approach of Demosthenes; they were surprised in their sleep, and put to the sword without any possibility of resistance. Thucydides considers the loss of the Ambraciots to have been the greatest that befell any Grecian city during the whole war prior to the Peace of Nicias; and he says, that if Demosthenes and the Acarnanians had marched against Ambracia at once, the city must have surrendered without a blow. The Acarnanians refused to undertake the enterprise, fearing that the Athenians might be more troublesome neighbours to them than the Ambraciots. On the contrary, they and the Amphilochians now concluded a peace with the Ambraciots for 100 years.

We know little more of the history of Argos. Some time after the death of Alexander the Great, it fell into the hands of the Aetolians, together with the rest of Ambracia: and it was here that the Roman general, M. Fulvius, took up his quarters, when he concluded the treaty between Rome and the Aetolians. Upon the foundation of Nicopolis by Augustus, after the Battle of Actium, the inhabitants of Argos were removed to the former city, and Argos was henceforth deserted. Later writers such as Pliny the Elder, Pomponius Mela, and Ptolemy mention it.

== Site ==
The site of Argos has been a subject of dispute. Thucydides says that it was situated on the sea. Polybius describes it as distant 180 stadia, and Livy 22 miles from Ambracia. William Martin Leake, writing in the 19th century placed it in the plain of Vlikha, at the modern village of Neokhori, where are the ruins of an ancient city, the walls of which were about a mile (1.6 km) in circumference. The editors of the Barrington Atlas of the Greek and Roman World tentatively identify a place called Ag. Ioannes, near Neokhori as the site of Argos.
