= Sicilian Expedition =

Athenian military expedition to Sicily during the Peloponnesian War (415–413 BC)

Coordinates: 37.0833°N 15.2833°E

- Part of the Peloponnesian War
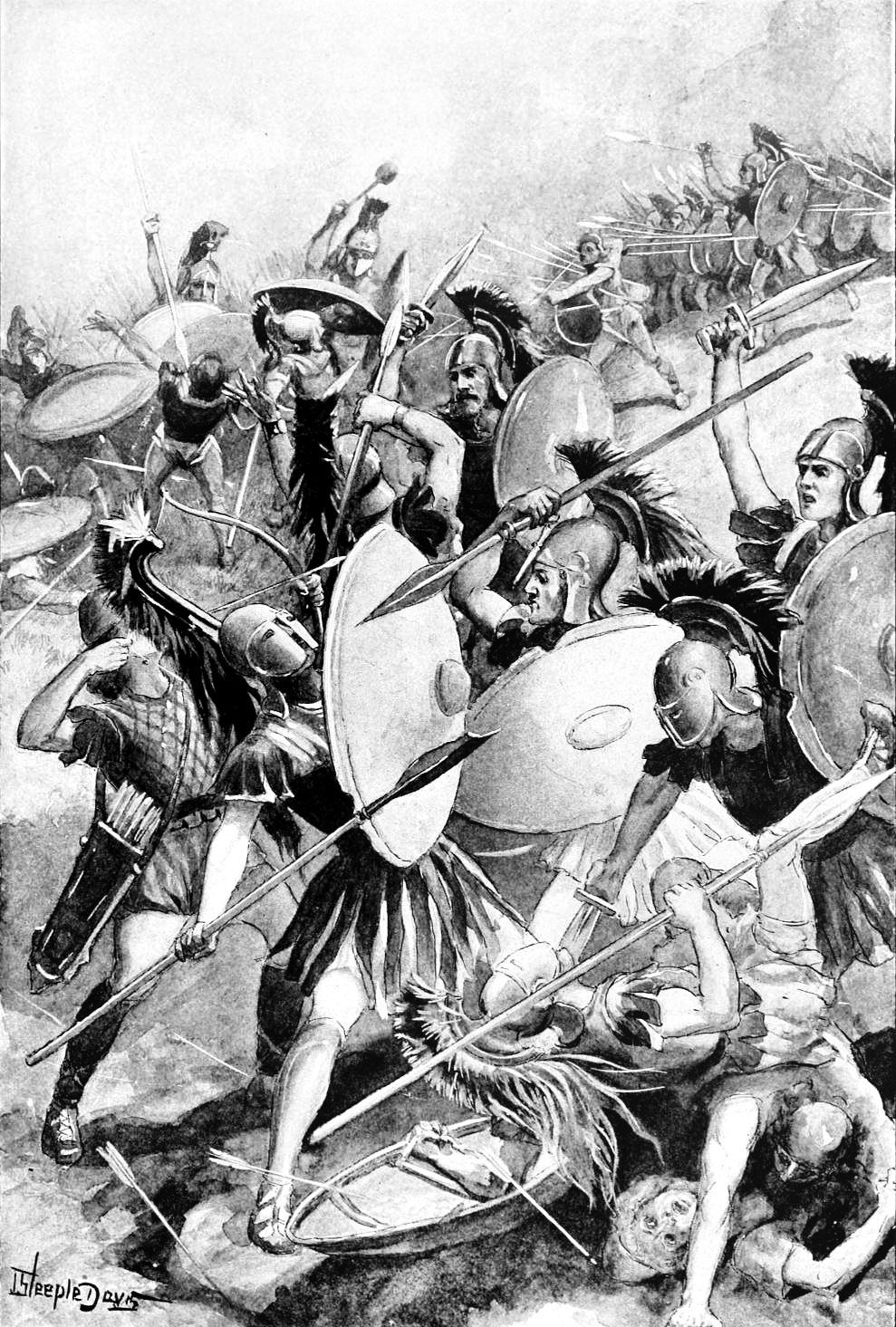
- Destruction of the Athenian army at Syracuse, as drawn in 1900
Date	415–413 BC
Location	Sicily
Result	Spartan–Syracusan victory

Belligerents
Delian League (led by Athens); Segesta; Etruscans	Peloponnesian League (led by Sparta); Corinth; Syracuse

Commanders and leaders
Alcibiades; Nicias (POW) (executed); Lamachus †; Demosthenes (POW) (executed); Eurymedon †	Gylippus; Hermocrates

Strength
Original expedition: 5,100 hoplites (heavy infantry); 480 archers; 700 slingers; 120 other light infantry; 30 cavalry; 134 triremes; 414 BC reinforcements: 250 Athenian cavalry; 30 mounted archers; 400 Sicilian mercenary cavalry; 413 BC reinforcements: 5,000 hoplites; large number of light troops; 73 triremes	Initially: 5,000–6,000 hoplites; 1,200 cavalry; At least 100 triremes; Gylippus's relief force: 700 armed sailors; 1,000 hoplites; 1,000 Sicel warriors; 100 cavalry; 413 BC relief force from Greece: 2,000 hoplites; 413 BC Sicilian relief force: 2,300 soldiers

Casualties and losses
Entire expeditionary force killed, captured or sold into slavery	Unknown

The Sicilian Expedition was an Athenian military campaign in Sicily from 415 to 413 BC during the Peloponnesian War. It pitted Athens and its allies against Syracuse, supported by Sparta and Corinth. The expedition ended in a devastating defeat for the Athenians and severely weakened their position in the war.

The expedition was hampered from the outset by uncertainty over its objectives and command structure. Political manoeuvring in Athens expanded an originally modest force of twenty ships into a massive armada, while the expedition's principal advocate, Alcibiades, was recalled to Athens to stand trial before the fleet had even reached Sicily. Despite these setbacks, the Athenians achieved early successes. Syracuse, the most powerful state in Sicily, responded slowly to the threat and was nearly surrounded and besieged before the arrival of reinforcements under the Spartan general Gylippus, who galvanised the city's resistance. Thereafter, the Athenians gradually lost the initiative. Although a large reinforcing armada from Athens briefly restored their advantage, a disastrous assault on a strategic high point and a series of crippling naval defeats undermined both their military effectiveness and morale. A final attempt to evacuate the army failed, and nearly the entire expeditionary force was killed, captured, or sold into slavery.

The consequences of the defeat were immense. Two hundred ships and thousands of soldiers, a significant portion of Athens' military resources, were lost in a single campaign. The disaster encouraged Athens' enemies in mainland Greece and Persia to intensify their efforts against the city, while revolts broke out among Athenian allies in the Aegean. Some historians regard the expedition's failure as the turning point of the war, although Athens continued fighting for another decade. Thucydides observed that contemporaries were astonished not that Athens eventually lost the war, but that it was able to continue fighting for so long after suffering such catastrophic losses. Although Athens rebuilt much of its fleet, the loss of experienced soldiers and sailors proved far more difficult to replace.

== Background ==
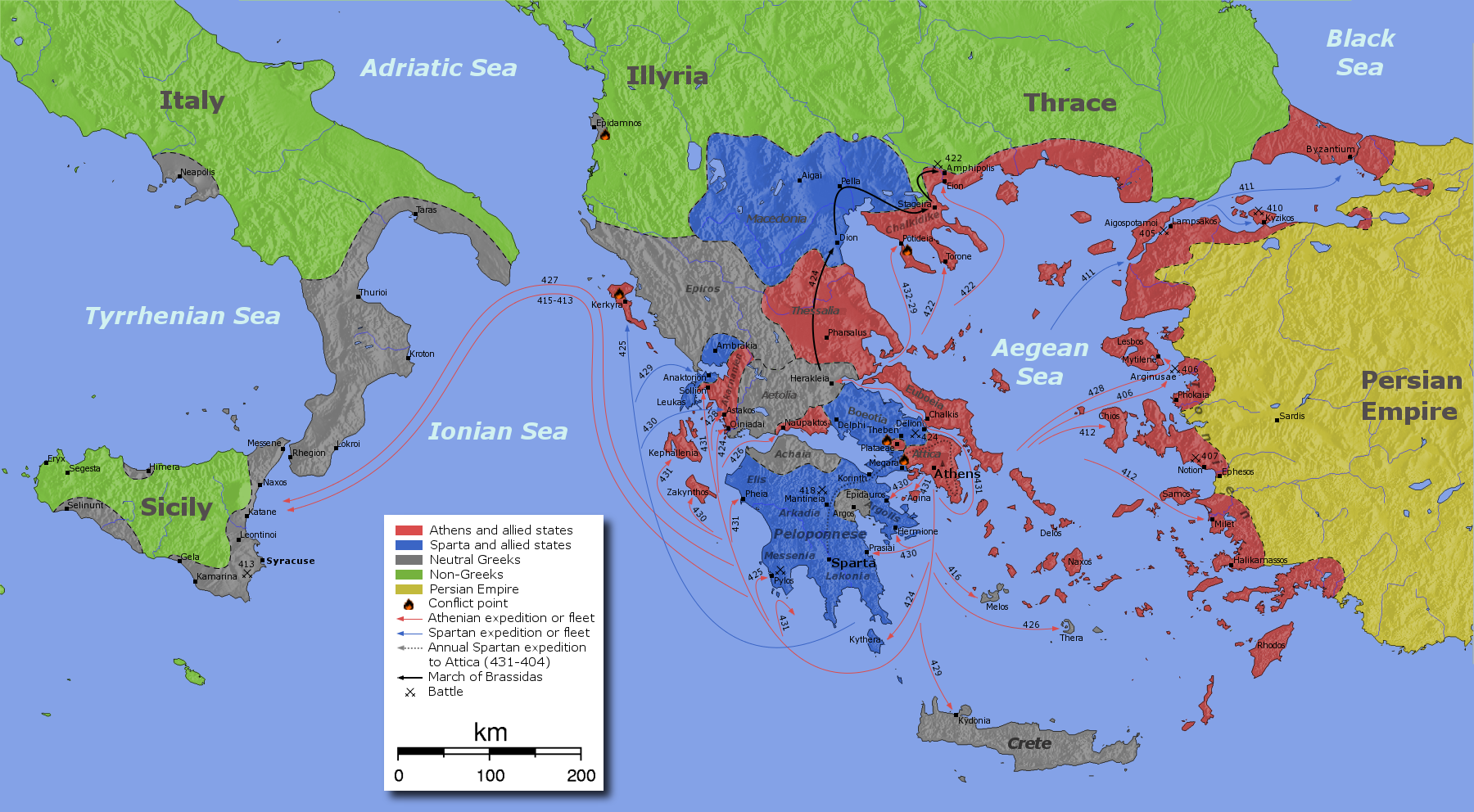
Sicily and the Peloponnesian War

=== Athens and Sicily ===
Although Athens had never involved itself deeply in Sicilian affairs, it had ties there before the onset of the Peloponnesian War, dating back to at least the mid-5th century BC. To small Sicilian cities, Athens was a potential counter to the powerful city of Syracuse, which was strong enough to potentially dominate the island. Syracuse, like Sparta and its Peloponnesian allies, was a Dorian city, while most of Athens's allies on the island were Ionian. Another source of conflict was the close relationship of Syracuse and other Dorian cities of the west to Athens's great commercial rival, Corinth. To the Athenians, Sicily was a threat—an unencumbered Syracuse might send grain or other aid to the Peloponnesians—as well as a venue for possible conquests.

In 427 BC, Athens had sent twenty ships, under the command of Laches, in response to an appeal for help from Leontini. That expedition, operating from a base at Rhegium, remained in the area for several years, fighting alongside Athens's local allies against the Syracusans and their allies, without achieving any dramatic successes. In 425, the Athenians planned to reinforce their contingent with an additional forty triremes, but that fleet never reached Sicily, as it became caught up in the pivotal Battle of Pylos on the way there. By the time that fleet reached Sicily in late summer, Athens's Sicilian allies had grown weary of stalemated warfare, and agreed to negotiate with Syracuse and its allies. At the Congress of Gela, the Sicilian cities made peace on the basis of "Sicily for the Sicilians", and the Athenian fleet left for home.

=== State of the war ===
In 415, Athens and Sparta had been formally at peace since 421, when the Peace of Nicias had brought the Archidamian War to a close. The terms of that peace, however, had never been fulfilled; Sparta had never surrendered Amphipolis to Athens, as required by the treaty, and in return the Athenians had held Pylos. More recently, Athenian and Spartan troops had fought at the Battle of Mantinea in 418, with Athens supporting Argos, Mantinea, and other Peloponnesian cities in an attempt to establish a stable anti-Spartan alliance in the Peloponnese. That attempt, largely orchestrated by the Athenian nobleman Alcibiades, would have destroyed Sparta's control over the Peloponnesian League had it succeeded. Alcibiades rebounded politically from this defeat, and was elected as a general in the spring of 417. Control of Athens' foreign policy remained divided between a "peace party" (or pro-Spartan party) led by Nicias, and a "war party" led by Alcibiades.

== Dispatch of the expedition ==
=== Appeal from Segesta ===
The peace established in Sicily at the Congress of Gela did not last long. Shortly after the Congress, Syracuse intervened in an episode of civil strife between the democratic and oligarchic parties in Leontini, supporting the oligarchs. Before too long, the prospect of foreign domination had united the Leontinians, and the two parties united in war against Syracuse. Athens had sent an emissary to Sicily in 422 to sound out the possibility of renewing the war against Syracuse, but achieved nothing. In 416, however, a second Sicilian conflict provided the invitation Athens had sought in 422. The city of Segesta—an Athenian ally in the 420s—went to war against Selinus and, after losing an initial battle, sent to Athens for help. In order to win the Athenians' support, the Segestaeans claimed that they were capable of funding much of the cost of sending a fleet, offering 60 talents of uncoined silver up front, and tricking Athenian ambassadors into believing that the city was more prosperous than it actually was, by making sure that the ambassadors saw all their golden and other valuable objects in a way as if these were just part of what they had.

=== The debate ===
At Athens, the Segestan ambassadors presented their case for intervention to the assembly, where debate over the proposal quickly divided along traditional factional lines. The assembly eventually approved an expedition composed of sixty triremes, without hoplite accompaniment, commanded by Nicias, Alcibiades, and Lamachus. Thucydides reports that Nicias had been appointed against his preference, but offers no further detail regarding that debate.

Five days after that first debate, a second assembly was held to arrange the logistics of the expedition. There, Nicias attempted to persuade the assembly to overturn its previous decision regarding whether to send an expedition at all. Over the course of several speeches, Nicias raised a series of different arguments against the expedition. He reminded the Athenians that they would be leaving powerful enemies behind them if they sent a force to Sicily, and warned that they would be opening hostilities with enemies too difficult and numerous to conquer and rule. Nicias also attacked Alcibiades's credibility, claiming that he and his allies were inexperienced and self-aggrandizing young men eager to lead Athens into war for their own ends.

In response, Alcibiades dismissed the attack on himself by pointing to the good he had done for Athens as a private citizen and public leader. He rebutted Nicias's warnings about the plan for the expedition by reminding the Athenians of their obligation to their Sicilian allies, appealing to the enterprising spirit that had won Athens her empire, and pointing out that many states on Sicily would support Athens in her operations there.

The assembly was clearly leaning towards Alcibiades's side, so Nicias, judging them unlikely to cancel the expedition if he argued against it directly, chose a different tactic. He described the wealth and power of the Sicilian cities Athens would be challenging, and stated that a larger expedition than previously approved would be required, expecting that the prospect of approving such a massive expenditure would prove unappealing to the citizenry. Contrary to Nicias's plan, the assembly enthusiastically embraced his proposal, and passed a motion allowing the generals to arrange for a force of over 100 ships and 5,000 hoplites. Nicias's ploy had failed badly. His misreading of the assembly had altered the strategic situation; whereas the loss of 60 ships would have been painful but bearable, the loss of the larger force would be catastrophic. According to Donald Kagan, "Without Nicias' intervention there would have been an Athenian expedition against Sicily in 415, but there could not have been a disaster."

=== Destruction of the hermai ===
After lengthy preparations, the fleet was ready to sail. The night before they were to leave, someone destroyed many of the hermai—the stone markers representing Hermes, placed around the city for good luck. This event was taken very seriously by the Athenian people as it was considered a bad omen for the expedition, as well as evidence of a revolutionary conspiracy to overthrow the government. According to Plutarch, Androcles, a political enemy of Alcibiades, used false witness to claim that Alcibiades and his friends were responsible. Alcibiades volunteered to be put on trial under penalty of death in order to prove his innocence (wanting to avoid his enemies charging him, in his absence, with more false information), but this request was denied.

He was otherwise extremely popular and had the support of the entire army; he had also gained the support of Argos and Mantinea during the preparations. He was not charged, and the fleet sailed the next day. His opponents, however, waited for Alcibiades to set sail before they leveled the charges against him. This was because the army, his main source of support, would be absent, and his supporters would be outnumbered when the votes were cast.

=== Reaction in Syracuse ===
Many people in Syracuse, the richest and most powerful city of Sicily, felt that the Athenians were in fact coming to attack them under the pretense of aiding Segesta in a minor war. The Syracusan general Hermocrates suggested that they ask for help from other Sicilian cities, and from Carthage. He also wanted to meet the Athenian fleet in the Ionian Sea before they arrived. Others argued that Athens was no threat to Syracuse, and some people did not believe there was a fleet at all, because Athens would not be so foolish as to attack them while they were still at war with Sparta. Athenagoras accused Hermocrates and others of attempting to instill fear among the population and trying to overthrow the government.

=== Three generals, three strategies ===
At the first assembly that authorized the expedition, the Athenians named Nicias, Alcibiades, and Lamachus as its commanders; that decision remained unchanged at the second assembly. Alcibiades was the expedition's leading proponent, and the leader of the war party, Nicias its leading critic and the leader of the peace party. Lamachus, meanwhile, was a fifty-year-old career soldier, of whom the longest extant portrayal is a series of scenes in Aristophanes' The Acharnians that satirize him as a braggadocious, perpetually impoverished warrior. The reasons for the Athenians' choice are not recorded, but the assembly may have been seeking to balance the aggressive young leader with a more conservative older figure, with Lamachus added for his military expertise.

In practice, each of the three generals proposed a different strategy. Nicias proposed a narrowly circumscribed expedition; he felt that the fleet should sail to Selinus and force a settlement between Selinus and Segesta. After that, he proposed to briefly show the flag around Sicily and then return home, unless the Segestans were willing to pay for the full cost of the expanded expedition. Alcibiades proposed to first attempt to win over allies on the island through diplomacy, and then attack Selinus and Syracuse. Lamachus, meanwhile, proposed taking advantage of the element of surprise by sailing directly to Syracuse and giving battle outside the city. Such a sudden attack, he felt, would catch the Syracusans off guard and possibly induce their quick surrender. Eventually, however, Lamachus settled the three-way division of opinion by endorsing Alcibiades's plan.

== Course of the expedition ==
=== Athenian landing ===
The route the Athenian fleet took to Sicily

The Athenian fleet first sailed to Corcyra to meet up with their allies, and the ships were divided into three sections, one for each commander. Three of the ships were sent ahead to look for allies in Sicily. The fleet at this point consisted of 134 triremes (100 of which were from Athens), 5,100 hoplites (of which 2,200 were Athenians), 480 archers, 700 slingers, 120 other light troops, and 30 cavalry, as well as 130 other supply ships and all the crews of the triremes and other non-combatants.

They had little luck finding allies along the coast of southern Italy and, when the three other ships returned, they learned that Segesta did not have the money they promised. Nicias had expected this, but the other commanders were dismayed. Nicias suggested they make a show of force and then return home, while Alcibiades said they should encourage revolts against Syracuse, and then attack Syracuse and Selinus. Lamachus said they should attack Syracuse right away, as it was the predominant city-state in Sicily and had clearly been taken unawares by the Athenians' presence.

The fleet proceeded to Catania, where an Athenian ship arrived to inform Alcibiades that he was under arrest, not only for the destruction of the hermai, but also for supposedly profaning the Eleusinian Mysteries. Alcibiades agreed to return in his ship, but when they stopped in southern Italy at Thurii, he escaped and sailed to the Peloponnese, where he sought refuge in Sparta. Athens passed a death sentence in absentia, his guilt seemingly proven. In Sparta, Alcibiades gave the members of the Peloponnesian League critical information on the Athenian Empire.

In Sicily, the fleet was redivided into two parts. The first contingent, commanded by Nicias, sailed to Segesta and forced the Segestans to pay the thirty talents they had promised the Athenians for their assistance against their rival Selinus. The second contingent, under Lamachus, sailed to and stormed Hyccara, a small city allied to Selinus, and enslaved its populace. The Athenian army then marched through the Sicilian interior, to impress and negotiate with the Sicels, and returned to Catania. There they wintered and made preparations for their upcoming siege of Syracuse. When the campaigning season started, the Syracusans moved against the Athenians while they were still encamped at Catania. While the Syracusans were marching to Catania, they learned the Athenians had boarded their ships and sailed into the Great Harbour at Syracuse. The Syracusans quickly hurried back and prepared for battle.

=== First Battle of Syracuse ===
The Athenian army landed to the south of Syracuse and fortified their position. When the Syracusan army finally arrived both sides waited for the other to make the first move. Eventually the Syracusans withdrew and made camp for the night. The next morning the Athenians lined up eight men deep, with the Argives and Mantineans on the right, the rest of the allies on the left, and the Athenians themselves in the centre. The Syracusans were deployed sixteen men deep, in order to offset the advantage of the Athenians in experience. They also had 1,200 cavalry, vastly outnumbering the Athenian cavalry, although the total numbers of men were about the same. The Athenians attacked first, believing themselves to be the stronger and more experienced army, and after some unexpectedly strong resistance, the Argives pushed back the Syracusan left wing, causing the rest to flee. The Syracusan cavalry prevented the Athenians from chasing them, thereby averting a catastrophe for the Syracusans, who lost about 260 men, and the Athenians about 50. The Athenians then sailed back to Catania for the winter.

=== Winter of 415 – spring of 414 BC ===
Hermocrates suggested that the Syracusans reorganize their army. He wanted to reduce the number of generals from fifteen to three; Hermocrates, Heraclides, and Sicanus were elected and Hermocrates sent for help from Corinth and Sparta. During the winter the Athenians also sent for more money and cavalry, while the Syracusans built some forts, and a wall extending the territory of the city.

Meanwhile, diplomats from both camps went to Camarina in an attempt to form an alliance with that city. Hermocrates wanted Camarina and the other cities to unite with Syracuse against Athens, but Euphemus, the representative for the Athenians, said Syracuse only wanted to rule Camarina, and they should join with Athens if they wanted to remain free. The Camarinans decided not to join either side, although they quietly sent aid to the Syracusans, whose greater proximity and potential victory they feared more than that of the Athenians.

Athens then sent for help from the Carthaginians and the Etruscans, as both were long-standing opponents of Syracuse. Carthage opted to stay out of the conflict, but several Etruscan cities banded together and organized a small force to aid Athens. Though the Etruscan force only included three large warships and a number of warriors, it provided crucial support to the Athenians. Athens and Syracuse also tried to gain assistance from the Greek cities in Italy. In Corinth, representatives from Syracuse met with Alcibiades, who was working with Sparta. Alcibiades informed Sparta that there would be an invasion of the Peloponnese if Sicily was conquered, and that they should send help to Syracuse and also fortify Decelea near Athens. The Athenians, he said, feared nothing more than the occupation of Decelea. The Spartans took this advice into consideration, and appointed Gylippus to command their fleet.

In the spring of 414 BC, reinforcements arrived from Athens, consisting of 250 cavalry, 30 mounted archers, and 300 talents of silver, which was used to pay for 400 more cavalry from their Sicilian allies. In the summer, they landed on the Epipolae, the cliff above Syracuse, which was defended by Diomilus and 600 Syracusans. In the attack, Diomilus and 300 of his men were killed.

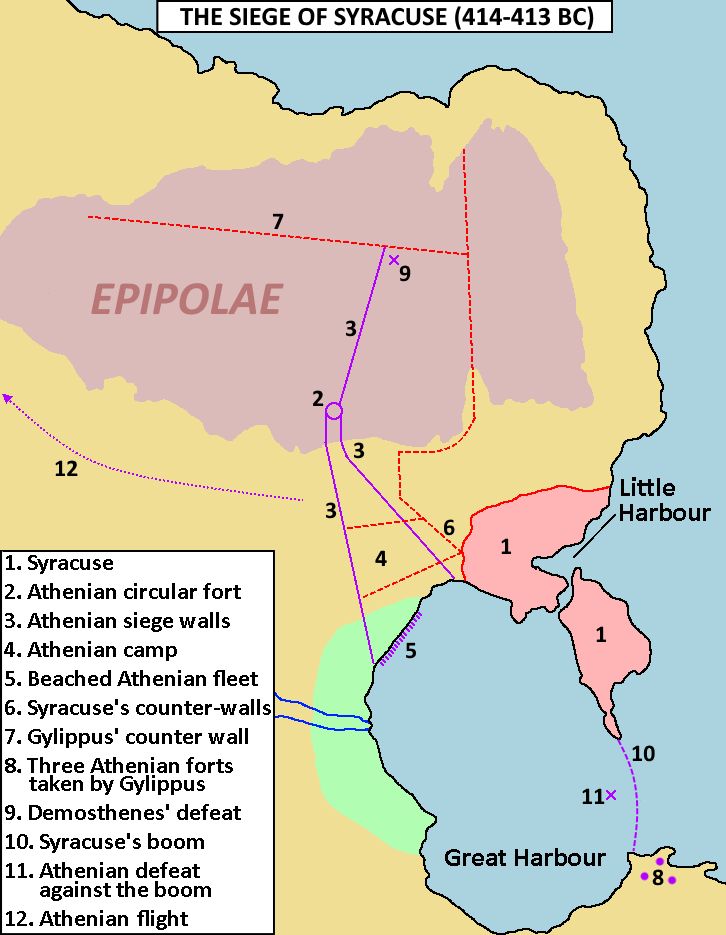
Map of the siege showing walls and counter-walls

Both sides then began building a series of walls. The Athenian circumvallation, known as "the Circle", was meant to blockade Syracuse from the rest of the island, while the Syracusans built a number of counter-walls from the city to their various forts. A force of 300 Athenians destroyed part of the first counter-wall, but the Syracusans began to build another one, this time with a ditch, blocking the Athenians from extending their wall to the sea. Another 300 Athenians attacked this wall and captured it, but were driven off by a Syracusan counter-attack in which Lamachus was killed, leaving only Nicias from the three original commanders. The Syracusans destroyed 300 m (1,000 feet) of the Athenian wall, but could not destroy the Circle, which was defended by Nicias. After Nicias defeated the attack, the Athenians finally extended their wall to the sea, completely blockading Syracuse by land, and their fleet entered the harbour to blockade them from sea. The Syracusans responded by removing Hermocrates and Sicanus as generals and replacing them with Heraclides, Eucles, and Tellias.

=== Spartan intervention ===
Soon after this, the Spartan general Gylippus, responding to the call for help, landed at Himera. He marched towards Syracuse with 700 armed sailors, 1,000 hoplites from Himera and Selinus, 100+ cavalry, and 1,000 Sicels. They built another counter-wall on the Epipolae, but were driven back by the Athenians; in a second battle, however, Gylippus defeated the Athenians by making better use of his cavalry and javelin-throwers. The Syracusans completed their counter-wall, making the Athenian wall useless. The Corinthian fleet also arrived, under the command of Erasinides.

Nicias, exhausted and suffering from illness, now believed it would be impossible to capture Syracuse. He wrote a letter to Athens, not trusting messengers to give an accurate report, and suggested that they either recall the expedition or send massive reinforcements. As during the initial debate on the expedition, he hoped the dire news and the additional cost of the reinforcements would be enough to convince the assembly to recall him, if not the whole expedition, allowing him to avoid most of the blame for its failure. But as it had the first time, the ploy backfired. The assembly chose to send reinforcements, under Demosthenes and Eurymedon. Eurymedon left immediately with ten ships, and Demosthenes left sometime later with a much larger force. Meanwhile, in early 413 BCE Sparta acted on Alcibiades's advice to fortify Decelea, and the Athenian force sent to relieve it was destroyed.

While Eurymedon was sailing, Gylippus's 80 Syracusan ships, including 35 triremes, attacked 60 of the Athenian ships (25 of which were triremes) in the harbour. Gylippus commanded a simultaneous attack on the Athenian land forces. In the harbour, the Athenians were successful, losing only three ships while the Syracusans lost eleven. However, Gylippus defeated the Athenians on land and captured two Athenian forts. Afterwards, Gylippus succeeded in convincing all the neutral cities on Sicily to join him, but the allies of Athens killed 800 Corinthians, including all but one of the Corinthian ambassadors.

=== Demosthenes' arrival ===
Demosthenes and Eurymedon then arrived with 73 ships and 5,000 hoplites. On their arrival, 80 Syracusan ships attacked 75 of the Athenian ships in their harbour. This battle went on for two days with no result, until the Syracusans pretended to back away and attacked the Athenians while they were eating. However, only seven Athenian ships were sunk.

Demosthenes landed his forces and attacked the Syracusan counter-wall on Epipolae in a risky night engagement (against the advice of Nicias). He succeeded in breaching the wall, routing or killing some of the first Syracusan defenders but was defeated by a force of Boeotians in the Spartan contingent. Many Athenians fell off the cliff to their deaths, and some of the rest were killed as they fled down the slope. Plutarch claims the casualties from this action numbered 2,000.

Demosthenes' arrival provided little relief to the other Athenians. Their camp was located near a marsh and many of them had fallen ill, including Nicias. Seeing this, Demosthenes thought they should all return to Athens to defend Attica against the Spartan invasion that had taken Decelea. Nicias, who had opposed the expedition at first, now did not want to show any weakness either to the Syracusans and Spartans, or to the Athenians at home who he thought would have him executed, stating he would rather die by the hands of the enemy than by those of his countrymen. He hoped the Syracusans would soon run out of money, and he had also been informed that there were pro-Athenian factions in Syracuse who were ready to turn the city over to him. Demosthenes and Eurymedon reluctantly agreed that Nicias might be right, but when reinforcements from the Peloponnese arrived, Nicias agreed that they should leave.

=== Second Battle of Syracuse ===
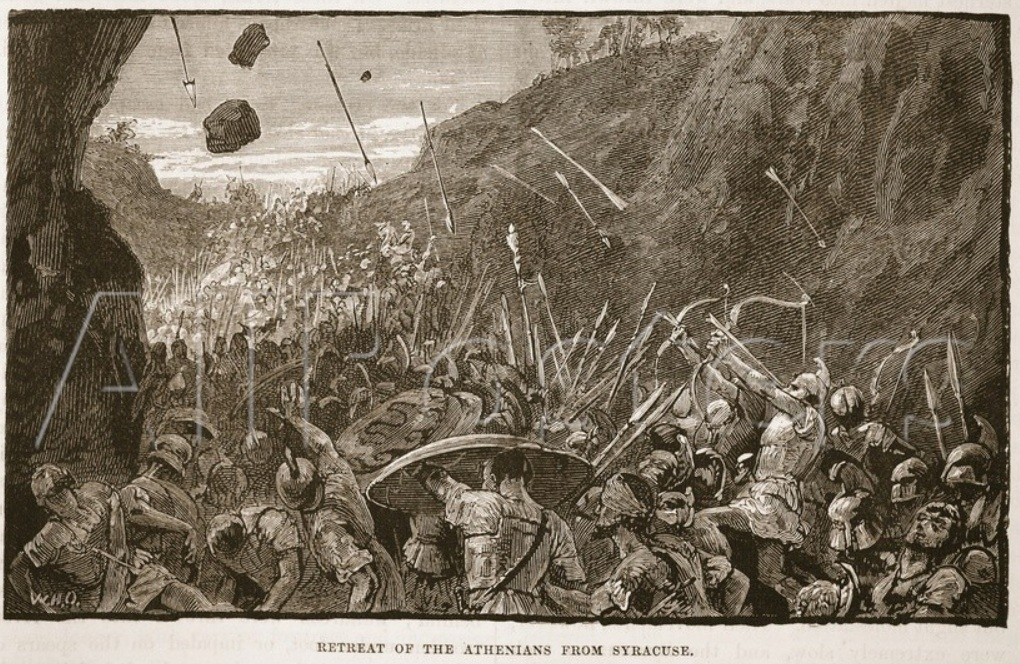
Retreat of the Athenians from Syracuse

Just as the Athenians were preparing to sail home, on 28 August, there was a lunar eclipse, and Nicias, described by Thucydides as a particularly superstitious man, asked the priests what he should do. They suggested the Athenians wait for another 27 days, and Nicias agreed.

The Athenians were now in a desperate situation. On 3 September, the Syracusans began to completely blockade the entrance to the port, trapping the Athenians inside. Outside Syracuse, the Athenians built a smaller walled enclosure for their sick and injured, and put everyone else (including many of the soldiers remaining on land) on their ships for one last battle, on 9 September. The fleet was now commanded by Demosthenes, Menander, and Euthydemus, while the Syracusan fleet was led by Sicanus and Agatharchus of Syracuse on the wings and Pythen from Corinth in the centre. Each side had about 100 ships participating.

The Athenian ships were extremely cramped and had no room to manoeuvre. Collisions were frequent, and the Syracusans could easily ram the Athenian ships head-on, without the Athenians being able to move to ram them broadside, as they preferred. Javelin throwers and archers shot from each ship, but the Syracusans deflected Athenian grappling hooks by covering their decks with animal hides.

The battle went on for some time with no clear victor, but the Athenian center under Menander eventually broke and was routed. Instead of pursuing their fleeing opponents, Pythen turned his Corinthian ships to attack the now-vulnerable Athenian right wing under Euthydemus. Beset from multiple sides, the right wing was defeated and largely destroyed; Euthydemus was killed as he tried to escape on the nearby shore. The destruction of Euthydemus' contingent shattered what remained of the Athenian fleet's order. The Athenian ships were subsequently pushed toward the coast; most Athenian crews abandoned their trapped vessels and fled to the camp behind their wall. Seeing the vulnerable Athenians running from their beached vessels, Gylippus ordered a furious but disorganized attack on land to catch his enemies before they could reach their base. However, the Spartan-led force was confronted by the small unit of Etruscans who had been sent to aid Athens; these warriors managed to stop Gylippus's assault. Using this respite, the Athenians rallied and returned to fight alongside the Etruscans, securing several of their ships on the beach and preventing a complete catastrophe. Historian David Abulafia concluded that the Etruscans had "saved the day" for the Athenians.

Demosthenes suggested that they man the ships again and attempt to force their way out, as now both fleets had lost about half their ships and Nicias agreed. The men themselves did not want to board the ship because they were afraid. They then decided to retreat by land. Hermocrates sent some supposed informers to the Athenians to falsely report that there were spies and roadblocks further inland, so the Athenians would be safer if they did not march away. Gylippus used this delay to build the roadblocks that did not yet exist, and the Syracusans burned or towed away the Athenian ships on the beach, so that they had no way off the island.

=== Final Syracusan-Spartan victory ===
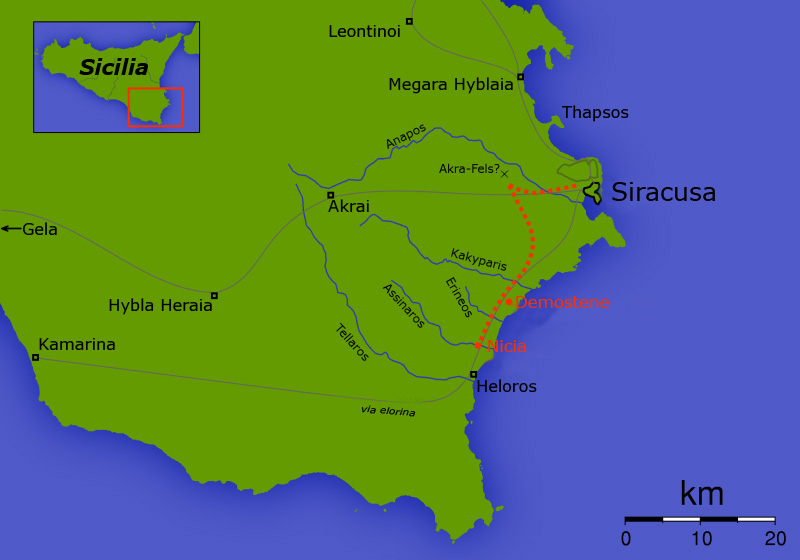
Map of Athenian retreat from Syracuse

On 13 September, the Athenians left camp leaving their wounded behind and their dead unburied. The survivors, including all the non-combatants, numbered 40,000, and some of the wounded crawled after them as far as they could go. As they marched they defeated a small Syracusan force guarding the river Anapus, but other Syracusan cavalry and light troops continually harassed them. Near the Erineus river, Demosthenes and Nicias became separated, and Demosthenes was attacked by the Syracusans and forced to surrender his 6,000 troops. The rest of the Syracusans followed Nicias to the Assinarus river, where Nicias's troops became disorganized in the rush to find drinking water. Many Athenians were trampled to death and others were killed while fighting with fellow Athenians. On the other side of the river a Syracusan force was waiting, and the Athenians were almost completely massacred, by far the worst defeat of the entire expedition in terms of lives lost. Nicias personally surrendered to Gylippus, hoping the Spartan would remember his role in the peace treaty of 421. The few who escaped found refuge in Catana.

The prisoners, now numbering only 7,000, were held in the stone quarries near Syracuse which were considered the safest prison for such a number of men. Demosthenes and Nicias were executed, against the orders of Gylippus. The rest spent ten weeks in horrible conditions in their makeshift prison, until all but the Athenians, Italians, and Sicilians were sold as slaves. The remaining Athenians were left to die slowly of disease and starvation in the quarry. In the end some of the very last survivors managed to escape and eventually trickled to Athens, bringing first-hand news of the disaster. The specific fate of Nicias and Demosthenes is not clearly recorded, but according to Thucydides's account, both were executed after their surrender, Demosthenes due to his earlier role in the war at Pylos, Nicias due to worries of a possibility of escape through bribery and possibility of causing later harm.

== Causes of the failure ==
Some historians have said that the Sicilian expedition was fatally flawed from the outset, that the Athenian attempt to conquer Sicily was an example of mad arrogance. Others, however, argue that there was nothing inherently wrong with the plan strategically, and that it would have succeeded if the Athenian leadership had not made a succession of bad tactical decisions. J. B. Bury judged that by far the biggest single reason for the expedition's catastrophic failure was the incompetence of Nicias, aggravated by the recall of Alcibiades. All of the different courses of action advocated by the three generals at the start of the campaign would have been viable options that could have advanced Athens's interests, but in retrospect Lamachus's suggestion to take advantage of Syracuse's lack of preparedness and attack immediately was likely to succeed and the best option.

James Tucci, a military historian at the U.S. Air Force's School of Advanced Air and Space Studies, made Nicias, particularly his decisions during the Sicilian Expedition, the subject of his entry in the 2022 anthology The Worst Military Leaders in History. He agreed that, had the Athenians returned after Lamachus's death as Nicias wanted to but was too timid to actually recommend, the expedition could still have been seen as moderately successful. Nonetheless, Nicias's own tactical decisions before that had adversely affected the expedition and compounded his strategic missteps. He had built Athens's southern circumvallation as a double wall close to the Syracuse city walls in order to make it easy to resupply and possibly negotiate a diplomatic solution with a pro-Athens dissenting faction he believed until the very end was planning a coup. But had he instead built a single wall farther to the south, it would have been easier to cut off Syracuse from resupply by land earlier than Athens eventually did, strengthening Athens's strategic position.

Nicias was also disingenuous in blaming long supply lines for the force's difficulties, when he himself had made the decision to locate the supply depot (destroyed by a Syracusan raid near the end of the expedition) far from the front lines. His letter to the assembly suggesting another massive commitment of reinforcements and ships was needed to turn the tide also did not admit that his failure to properly deploy the ships he had had allowed Gylippus to get through and make contact with the Syracusans.

== Aftermath ==
For Athens, the expedition was a "human disaster as painful as the plague [as well as a] political disaster" which severely harmed the city's war efforts and hegemony over its allies. Sparta exploited this weakness to greatly increase the pressure on its rival over the next years, though it could not achieve a strategic breakthrough. In contrast, the Etruscans who had fought alongside the Athenians were proud of their role in the conflict. For instance, the Spurinna family of Tarquinia possibly continued to honor their involvement in the Sicilian Expedition for centuries.

=== Athenian reaction ===
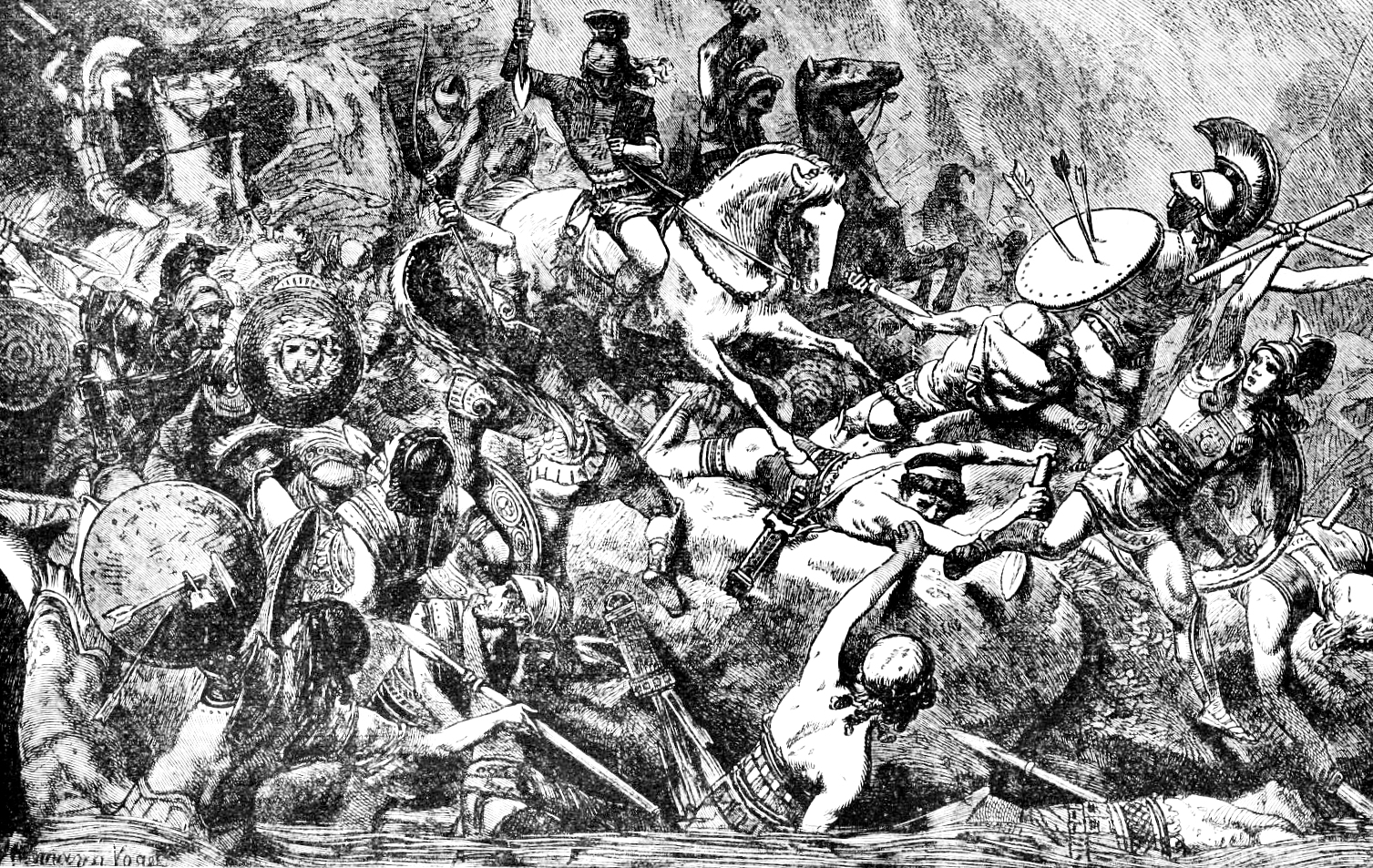
Destruction of the Athenian army in Sicily

In Athens, the citizens did not, at first, believe the defeat. Plutarch, in his Life of Nicias, recounts how the news reached the city:

It is said that the Athenians would not believe their loss, in a great degree because of the person who first brought them news of it. For a certain stranger, it seems, coming to Piraeus, and there sitting in a barber's shop, began to talk of what had happened, as if the Athenians already knew all that had passed; which the barber hearing, before he acquainted anybody else, ran as fast as he could up into the city, addressed himself to the Archons, and presently spread it about in the marketplace. On which, there being everywhere, as may be imagined, terror and consternation, the Archons summoned a general assembly, and there brought in the man and questioned him how he came to know. And he, giving no satisfactory account, was taken for a spreader of false intelligence and a disturber of the city, and was, therefore, fastened to the wheel and racked a long time, till other messengers arrived that related the whole disaster particularly. So hardly was Nicias believed to have suffered the calamity which he had often predicted.

When the magnitude of the disaster became evident, there was a general panic. Attica seemed free for the taking, as the Spartans were so close by in Decelea. The defeat caused a great shift in policy for many other states, as well. States which had until now been neutral joined with Sparta, assuming that Athens's defeat was imminent. Many of Athens' allies in the Delian League also revolted, and although the city immediately began to rebuild its fleet, there was little they could do about the revolts for the time being. The expedition and consequent disaster left Athens reeling. Some 10,000 hoplites had perished and, though this was a blow, the real concern was the loss of the huge fleet dispatched to Sicily. Triremes could be replaced, but the 30,000 experienced oarsmen lost in Sicily were irreplaceable and Athens had to rely on ill-trained slaves to form the backbone of her new fleet.

In 411 BC, the Athenian democracy was overthrown in favour of an oligarchy, and Persia joined the war on the Spartan side. Although things looked grim for Athens, they were able to recover for a few years. The oligarchy was soon overthrown, and Athens won the Battle of Cynossema; however, the defeat of the Sicilian expedition was essentially the beginning of the end for Athens. In 404 BC they were defeated and occupied by Sparta.

== In popular culture ==
Mary Renault's historical novel The Last of the Wine gives an account of the Peloponnesian War and the Athenian defeat at Syracuse.

John Fletcher's 90 minute radio play The Sicilian Expedition – Ancient Athenian War Drama with Iraq War, which was broadcast on BBC Radio 3 in December 2005, is based on real events from the Peloponnesian War, particularly the Sicilian Expedition. Fletcher implies a parallel between U.S. involvement in the Iraq war and the Athenian aggression against Sicily, which in his view were both disastrous abroad and at home.

This expedition is portrayed in the real-time strategy video game Age of Empires II DE and its DLC Chronicles: Battle for Greece.

Ferdia Lennon's debut novel Glorious Exploits is set in the aftermath of the conflict. Implementing anachronistic prose, the plot centres around the Athenian prisoners in Syracuse and the quarry they are prisoned within.

== Sources ==
- Abulafia, David (2011). The Great Sea: A Human History of the Mediterranean. Oxford: Oxford University Press. ISBN 978-0-19-532334-4.
- Nancy Demand, A History of Ancient Greece. McGraw-Hill, 1996. ISBN 0-07-016207-7
- Kagan, Donald (1981). The Peace of Nicias and the Sicilian Expedition. Ithaca, New York: Cornell University Press. ISBN 0-8014-1367-2.
- Thucydides, History of the Peloponnesian War.
- Marie Durnerin, "The risk of open voting, Army, assembly and fake news at the end of the Sicilian Expedition". 2019.
- Philip Matyszak, Expedition to Disaster. Pen & Sword Military, 2012. ISBN 978-1-84884-887-0
- Tucci, James (2022). "Nikias". In Jennings, John M.; Steele, Chuck (eds.). The Worst Military Leaders in History. London: Reaktion Books. ISBN 9781789145830.
