= Crenae =

Town in ancient Acarnania

Coordinates: 38°54′48″N 21°09′50″E

Crenae or Krenai (Ancient Greek: Κρῆναι) was a town in ancient Acarnania, where the Acarnanians on their march to protect of Amphilochian Argos took up position prior to the Battle of Olpae; Eurylochus, with the Peloponnesian forces, had marched through Acarnania, and had succeeded in joining the Ambraciots at Olpae, passing unperceived between Argos and the Acarnanian force at Crenae.

Its site is tentatively located near the modern Paliavli.
