= Eurylochus (given name) =

Eurylochus is a companion of Odysseus in Greek mythology.

Eurylochus may also refer to:

- Eurylochus (Spartan general) (died 426 BC), Spartan general during the Peloponnesian War, killed at the Battle of Olpae
- Eurylochus, 6th century BC Thessalian general who fought in the First Sacred War
- Eurylochus, 4th century BC student of Pyrrho, along with Hecataeus of Abdera and others (the "Pyrrhoneans")
- Eurylochus (mythology), several other figures in Greek mythology
- Eurylochus, a character based on the mythological figure in EPIC: The Musical
