= Hyaea =

Town in Ozolian Locris

Hyaea or Hyaia (Ancient Greek: Ὑαία) was a town in Ozolian Locris. Thucydides writes that during the Peloponnesian War, Hyaea was among the cities of Ozolian Locris that refused to provide hostages to the Spartan army under Eurylochus in 426 BCE until the city was taken by force.

Its site is unlocated.
