= Battle of Tanagra =

Battle of Tanagra may refer to:

- Battle of Tanagra (457 BC)
- Battle of Tanagra (426 BC)
