= Autocles, son of Tolmaeus =

5th-century BC Athenian general

Autocles (Ancient Greek: Aὐτοκλῆς; lived 5th century BC), a son of Tolmaeus, was an ancient Athenian general.

He was one of the Athenian commanders in the successful expedition against Cythera in 424 BC. Together with his two colleagues, Nicias and Nicostratus, he ratified, on the part of Athens, the truce which in 423 BC was concluded for one year with Sparta.
