= Heracleides (415 BC) =

5th-century BCE Syracusan politician and general

Heracleides (Ancient Greek: Ἡρακλείδης), son of Lysimachus, was a Syracusan from Magna Graecia and one of the three strategoi (generals) appointed by the Syracusans after their first defeat by the Athenians upon the arrival of the Athenian expedition on Sicily in 415 BC. Heracleides and his colleagues, Hermocrates and Sicanus, were invested with full powers to deal with the Athenian threat. Hermocrates ascribed the Syracusan defeat to the number of the generals, which he deemed too high, and their want of sufficient control over their troops. The Syracusans reduced the number of generals from fifteen to three and invested them with full powers. Heracleides and his colleagues were deposed from their command in the following summer on account of their failure in preventing the progress of the Athenian siege works. Of the three generals appointed in their place, one was also named Heracleides.
