= Molycreia =

Coordinates: 38°23′05″N 21°44′58″E

Molycreia or Molykreia (Ancient Greek: Μολύκρεια), or Molycreium or Molykreion (Μολύκρειον), or Molycria or Molykria (Μολυκρία), was a town of Aetolia, situated near the sea-coast, and at a short distance from the promontory Antirrhium, which was hence called Ῥίον τὸ Μολυκρικόν, or Μολύκριον Ῥίον. Some writers call it a Locrian town. It is said by Strabo to have been built after the return of the Heracleidae into Peloponnesus. It was colonised by the Corinthians, but was subject to the Athenians in the early part of the Peloponnesian War. It was taken by the Spartan commander Eurylochus, with the assistance of the Aetolians, in 426 BCE. It was considered sacred to Poseidon.

Its site is tentatively located near the modern Velvina/Elliniko.
