= Metropolis (Amphilochia) =

Metropolis (Ancient Greek: Μητρόπολις) was a city in ancient Amphilochia, Greece, near to and probably northeast of Olpae. During the Peloponnesian War, the Spartan general Eurylochus camped here prior to the Battle of Olpae in which he was slain.
