= Salynthius =

Salynthius (Ancient Greek: Σαλύνθιος) was king of the Agraeans in the 5th century BC. He is known from accounts of the Peloponnesian War, particularly in connection with the events following the Battle of Olpae in 426 BC. After that battle, surviving Ambraciots and Peloponnesian troops withdrew from the area and took refuge in the neighboring territory of the Agraeans. Salynthius received these fugitives and gave them protection.

Two years later, in 424 BC, Salynthius became involved in a wider Athenian campaign in western Greece. Demosthenes, acting as part of coordinated Athenian operations in the region, invaded the territory of the Agraeans, defeated Salynthius, and reduced him to subjection, bringing his people under Athenian control.
