= Agatharchus of Syracuse =

5th-century BC Syracusian admiral and general

Agatharchus
- Ἀγάθαρχος
- Military career
- Allegiance: Syracuse
- Rank: Commander
- Conflicts: Battle of Syracuse

Agatharchus or Agatharch of Syracuse (Greek: Ἀγάθαρχος) was a Syracusan from Magna Graecia who was placed by the Syracusans over a fleet of twelve ships in 413 BC, to visit their allies and harass the Athenians. He was afterwards, in the same year, one of the Syracusan commanders in the decisive battle fought in the city's harbor during the Battle of Syracuse.
