= Lysimachus (disambiguation) =

Lysimachus (Greek: Λυσίμαχος) is an ancient and modern Greek name meaning "scattering the battle". The female equivalent of the name is Lysimache.

The name may refer to:

- Lysimachus the father of the Athenian politician Aristides the Just who had a grandson of the same name through Aristides
- Lysimachus, the archon at Athens in 436/435 BCE.
- Lysimachus of Acarnania, second tutor of Alexander of Great
- Lysimachus, a general who was a somatophylax of Alexander the Great and later King of Thrace, Macedonia and Asia Minor. Other members of his family include:
  - his son, Lysimachus, one of the sons from his third wife Arsinoe II
  - his grandson, Lysimachus of Egypt, one of the sons of Ptolemy II Philadelphus from his first wife Arsinoe I, who was one of the daughters of Lysimachus
  - his other grandson, Lysimachus of Telmessos, first son of Ptolemy I Epigone who was the first son of Lysimachus from his third wife Arsinoe II
  - his great-grandson, Lysimachus one of the sons of Berenice II and Ptolemy III Euergetes who was a brother of Lysimachus of Egypt
- Lysimachus, a physician from the Greek island of Kos
- Lysimachus, a comic poet of Old Comedy
- Lysimachus of Alexandria, 1st century BCE, grammarian from Alexandria of Ancient Egypt
- Lysimachus, the brother of High Priest Menelaus.
- Lysimachus, the translator of Greek version of the book of Esther.
- Lysimachus, a King of Sicily whom the Lysimachia, a genus of flowering plants, was named after
- Lysimachus, fictional governor of Mytilene in Shakespeare's Pericles, Prince of Tyre
