= Olpae =

Town of ancient Amphilochia

Coordinates: 38°57′05″N 21°08′39″E

Olpae or Olpai (Ancient Greek: Ὄλπαι) was a town of ancient Amphilochia, where the Battle of Olpae was fought between the Spartans and the Athenians in 426 BC during the Peloponnesian War. Olpae sat upon a fortified hill, in the territory of Amphilochian Argos, 25 stadia (about 3 miles, 5 km) from Argos itself. Eurylochus, the Spartan commander, marched from Aetolia, with 3000 hoplites into the territory of Amphilochian Argos, and captured Olpae.

Thereupon, the Acarnanians marched to the protection of Argos and took up their position at Crenae. In the meantime, Eurylochus, with the Peloponnesian forces, had marched through Acarnania, and had succeeded in joining the Ambraciots at Olpae, passing unperceived between Argos itself and the Acarnanian force at Crenae. He then took post at Metropolis, probably northeast of Olpae. Shortly afterwards Demosthenes, who had been invited by the Acarnanians to take the command of their troops, arrived in the Ambraciot Gulf with 20 Athenian ships, and anchored near Olpae. Having disembarked his men, and taken the command, he encamped near Olpae.

The two armies were separated only by a deep ravine, and as the ground was favourable for ambush, Demosthenes hid some men in a bushy dell, so that they might attack the rear of the enemy. The stratagem was successful, Demosthenes gained a decisive victory, and Eurylochus was slain in the battle. This victory was followed by another still more striking.

The Ambraciots at Olpae had some days before sent to Ambracia, to beg for reinforcements; a large Ambraciot force had entered the territory of Amphilochia about the time when the Battle of Olpae was fought. Demosthenes being informed of their march on the day after the battle, formed a plan to surprise them in a narrow pass above Olpae. Demosthenes sent forward a detachment to secure the peak above the pass, and then marched through the pass in the night. The Ambraciots had obtained no intelligence of the defeat of their comrades at Olpae, or of the approach of Demosthenes; they were surprised in their sleep, and put to the sword without any possibility of resistance.

Its site is located near the modern Agrilovouni.
