= Aegitium =

Coordinates: 38°29′26″N 22°10′11″E

Aegitium or Aigition (Ancient Greek: Αἱγίτιον) was a town in Aetolia Epictetus, on the borders of Locris, situated in the midst of mountains, about 80 stadia from the sea. Here, in the Peloponnesian War, the Athenian army under Demosthenes took the town in 426 BCE, but the inhabitants escaped to the nearby hills and continually harassed the Athenians, eventually forcing their withdrawal.

The site of Aegitium is located near modern Aigitio.
