= Asinaro =

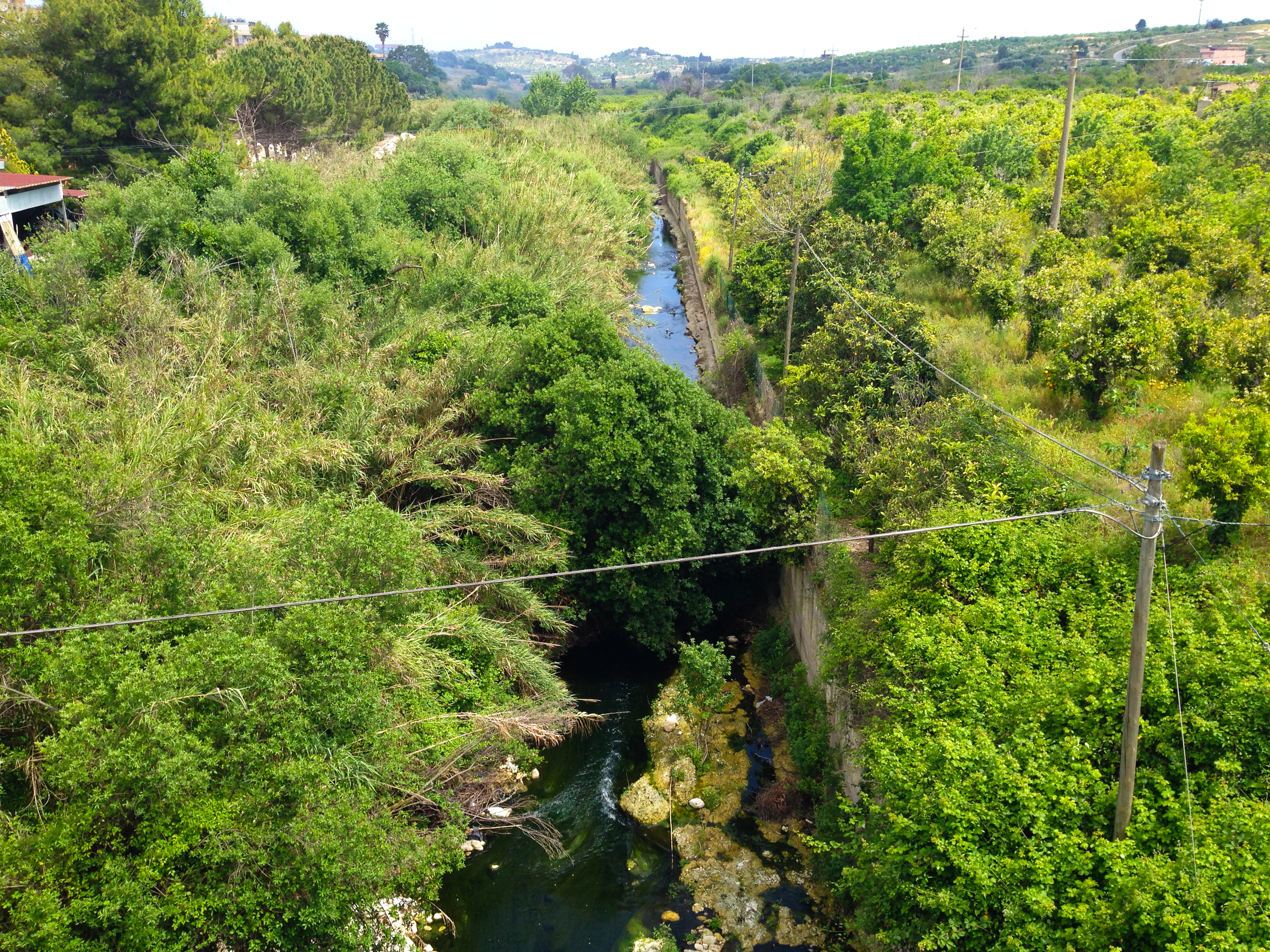
- The Asinaro near Noto

Location
- Country: Italy
- Region: Sicily

Physical characteristics
- Mouth: Ionian Sea
  - coordinates: 36°52′35″N 15°8′9″E

The Asinaro is a river in Sicily in the province of Syracuse. It is 22 km long, flowing from the Hyblaean Mountains into the Ionian Sea. It passes through the UNESCO World Heritage city of Noto. The river was known as the Assinaros in antiquity; in 413 BC it was the site of the final crushing defeat of the retreating Athenian expeditionary force which had been besieging Syracuse.
