= Congress of Gela =

5th century BC diplomatic meeting

The Congress of Gela was a diplomatic meeting between a number of Sicilian cities in 424 BC. It brought a temporary halt to several years of warfare between cities on the island. At the conference, the Sicilian cities agreed to a Syracusan proposal to make peace and agree to a platform of "Sicily for the Sicilians", which has been compared to the Monroe Doctrine. Though the agreement was intended to be perpetual, both war and outside involvement in Sicilian affairs resumed within a few decades.

== Background ==
A conflict between Syracuse and Leontini led to an appeal for help from Leontini to Athens. The Athenians sent twenty ships to support Leontini in 427 BC.

By 426 BC, a wide-ranging conflict had broken out including many Greek cities and native Sicels. Athenian forces, fighting alongside Rhegium, Leontini, Naxos, Kamarina, and various Sicel tribes, won several initial successes. In 426, Athenian forces captured the strategically vital city of Messina and attacked several other towns allied to Syracuse. However, Syracuse, which led an alliance including Locris, Gela, and other cities, regained the initiative by 425 BC, recaptured Messina, and threatened several of Athens' allies.

== Peace initiative ==
Kamarina and Gela, two traditional allies, had found themselves on different sides of the conflict; Gela was an ally of Syracuse, while Kamarina was deeply hostile to that city. The two concluded an armistice in the late summer of 425. Since a bilateral peace was unlikely to last if the rest of the island remained at war, the two cities invited all the belligerents to convene and discuss peace terms. The cities not only sent ambassadors but also granted them unusually broad power to conduct diplomacy.

== The Congress ==
The proceedings of the Congress are known largely through the writings of the historian Thucydides. Since Thucydides was not in Sicily at the time, his account of the specific speeches is certainly his own composition; historians have differed over whether the gist of the comments delivered is reflected in Thucydides account. Modern historians have generally concluded that Thucydides presents the general thrust of the meeting accurately, and his account is followed here.

The meeting opened with complaints from various states about the wrongs done to them during the war. It shifted tone, however, after a speech by Hermocrates, a Syracusan delegate, making an extended appeal to Sicilian unity and warning against the threat of Athens. Hermocrates painted a picture of peaceful coexistence between the Greek cities of Sicily, supported by unified opposition to outside interference.

Historian Donald Kagan has compared Hermocrates' proposal to the Monroe Doctrine—both in its high-minded appeal to self determination and in its intrinsic benefit for the powerful state that proposed it. Syracuse, in 424, was the single largest and most powerful state on Sicily, and stood to dominate the island's politics if outside influences like Athens were excluded. Whether because of persuasion, war-weariness, or a mixture of the two, the representatives at the conference agreed to conclude a peace on the basis of the status quo, with Syracuse ceding Morgantina to the Kamarinians in exchange for monetary payments. The generals commanding Athens' fleet in the area acceded to the treaty and departed for mainland Greece, bringing an end to hostilities in the region.
