= Nicias =

Athenian politician and general (5th century BC)

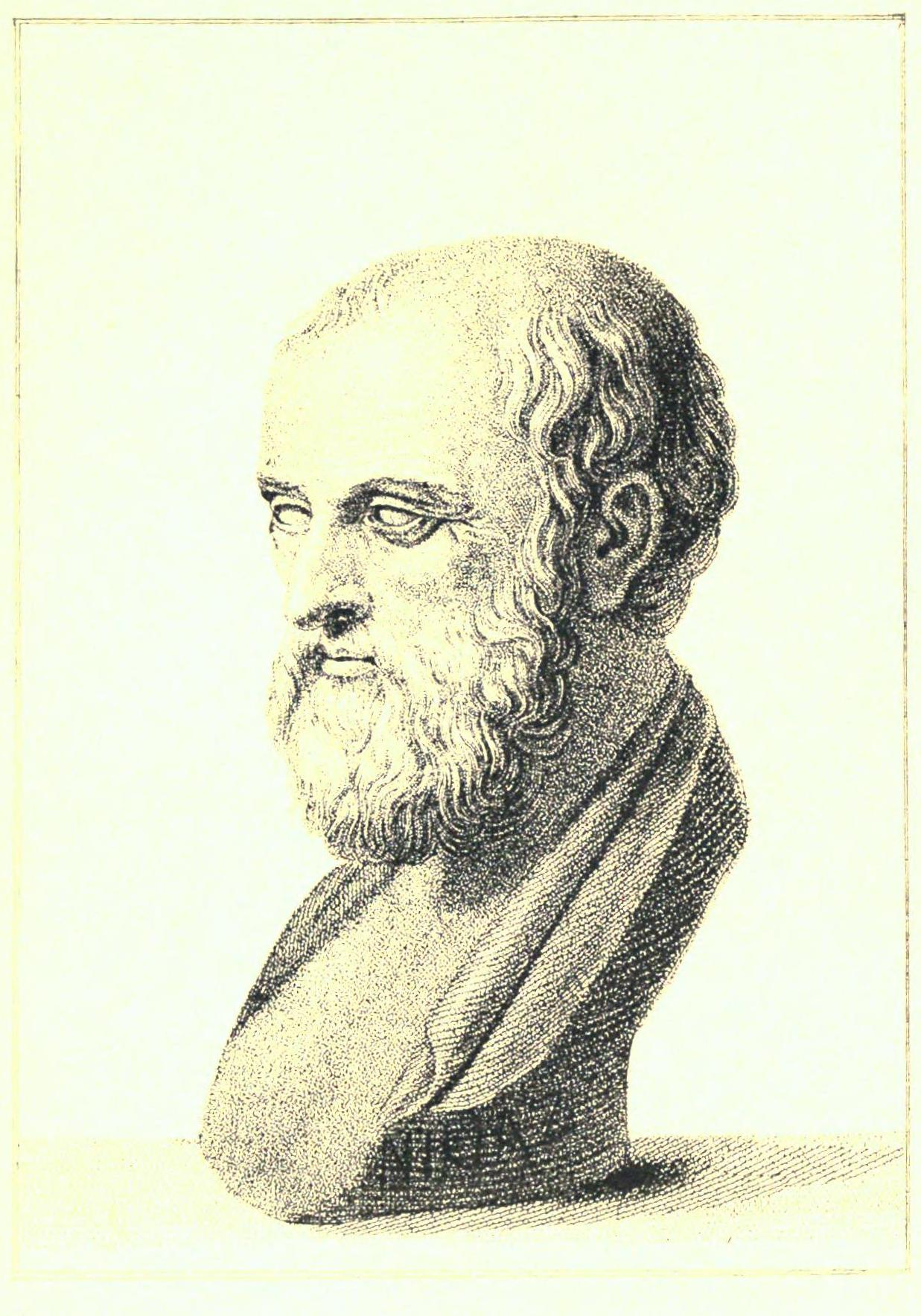
- Native name: Νικίας Νικηράτου Κυδαντίδης
- Born: c. 470 BC; Athens, Greece
- Died: 413 BC (aged 56/57) Syracuse, Sicily
- Allegiance: Athens
- Rank: Strategos (general)
- Known for: Peace of Nicias
- Conflicts: Peloponnesian War; Sicilian Expedition (POW) (executed)
- Other work: Peace of Nicias

Nicias (/ˈnɪʃiəs/; Ancient Greek: Νικίας Νικηράτου Κυδαντίδης, romanized: Nikias Nikēratou Kydantidēs; c. 470–413 BCE) was an Athenian politician and general, who was prominent during the Peloponnesian War. A member of the Athenian aristocracy, he inherited a large fortune from his father, and had investments in the silver mines around Laurion, in south-east Attica.

Following the death of Pericles in 429 BCE, Nicias became the principal rival of Cleon and the democrats in the struggle for political leadership of the Athenian state. Politically a moderate conservative, he opposed the aggressive imperialism of Cleon and Alcibiades. Despite his political views, Nicias served as strategos (general) during the Peloponnesian War, and led a number of expeditions which were mostly successful, although he had a reputation for being over-cautious. Nicias' goal was to conclude a peace with Sparta on terms favourable to Athens, and he was largely responsible for negotiating the short-lived Peace of Nicias in 421.

In 415 BCE, Nicias was appointed commander of Athens' ill-fated Sicilian Expedition. A series of disasters led to the destruction of the Athenian forces, and Nicias was executed by the Syracusans in 413.

== Early life and political rise ==
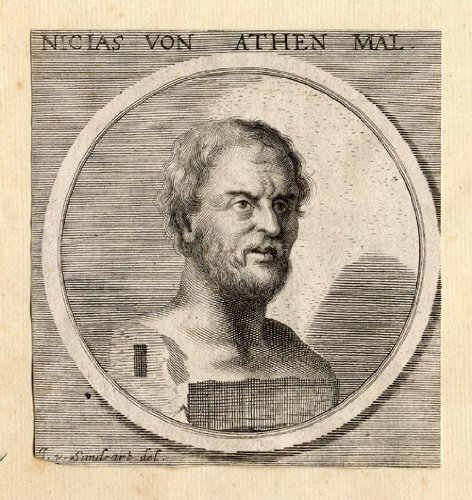
Bust of Nicias

Nicias was born c.470 BC in Athens. His wealthy, slaveowning family was aristocratic, and strictly adhered to conservative principles politically. He inherited a fortune from his father, Niceratus, and had considerable interests in the silver mines of Laurion. Xenophon wrote that Nicias owned a thousand men in the silver mines, whom he lent out to Sosias, a Thracian, for a return of one obol per head daily. Historian Nicholas Hammond commented that other slaves would have worked in domestic service, agriculture, skilled crafts, or as unskilled labourers.

Nicias' rise to prominence occurred while Pericles was at the head of the Athenian government, and as a noted member of the aristocracy, he became a frequent military and political colleague of Pericles. After Pericles' death in 429 BC, Nicias became an important Athenian politician with the aristocrats looking to him as their leader and, as such, he became the rival of Cleon, who was then the leader of the city's democratic movement. Classical historian J. B. Bury argued, however, that Nicias was unsuitable for the role, since he "had not the qualities of a leader or a statesman". As for how Nicias came to wield influence among the aristocracy, Bury acknowledged his honesty and integrity in that he was impervious to bribes. He was also considered to be respectable, given his family background, and well acquainted with military details; but he was particularly admired for his unscrupulous devotion to religion.

Public generosity was the means by which Nicias acquired popularity. He patronised various charitable causes and city services, especially if there was a religious connection. Plutarch commented on him gaining prestige by his sponsorship of both a statue of Athena and a shrine to Dionysus. Plutarch specifically mentioned Nicias' support for the annual Festival of Delos, as he paid for the construction of a bridge of boats between Delos and Rheneia. This bridge, extravagantly decorated with garlands and tapestry, enabled a richly-dressed chorus to walk across to Rheneia. Nicias donated 10,000 drachma, so the Delians could continue to stage the event, and pray on his behalf. His instructions were engraved on a pillar.

== Military career to 424 BC ==
Politically and militarily, Nicias was one of Athens' key figures in the Peloponnesian War. According to Richard Crawley's translation, the first mention of Nicias by Thucydides is in the Fifth Year of the War (428 BC). In the summer of that year, after Athenian forces had suppressed a revolt by Lesbos, Nicias was placed in command of an expedition against Minoa, an island off Megara which had a watchtower used by the Megarians to observe Athenian shipping. Nicias desired to reverse this situation so that Athens could spy on Peloponnesian vessels, and effectively blockade Nisaea, the port of Megara. The expedition was a success and, having built additional fortifications on Minoa, Nicias left a garrison there. While these victories burnished Nicias's military reputation, many of them were the result of luck rather than military acumen, as many of the objectives taken were lightly defended islands, or raids not meant to take territory, and Nicias did not take many chances with his troops.

Next year, Nicias was appointed to command a fleet of sixty ships, carrying two thousand heavy infantry, and attack Melos, Tanagra, and the seaboard of Locris. The Melians refused to join the Delian Confederacy, but the operations were otherwise successful.

The naval Battle of Pylos, in 425 BC, resulted in a victory for Athens which left some 420 Spartan hoplites stranded on the island of Sphacteria. Desperate to rescue these soldiers, Sparta sued for peace, but the negotiations failed as Sparta could not meet the Athenian terms. Athens then besieged Sphacteria, but without success as the Spartans were entrenched with adequate supplies of food and water. The stalemate caused political crisis in Athens, where many citizens argued that Sparta's offer of peace should have been accepted.

As the main pro-war spokesman, Cleon insisted the reports from Sphacteria were misleading, and that if he were the commander instead of Nicias, he would go there and overcome the garrison. Thucydides reported that a row developed in the assembly, mainly between Cleon and Nicias. Nicias countered the criticism of himself by offering to resign his command so Cleon could lead reinforcements to Sphacteria, an offer Nicias believed Cleon would find some way not to accept, hurting him politically.

Cleon did try to back down but Nicias had swayed the assembly, and Cleon had no choice but to accept the command, although he was ridiculed for promising he could resolve the military situation in just 20 days. He and Demosthenes did exactly that in the ensuing Battle of Sphacteria, taking 292 Spartan prisoners, who became an important bargaining counter in the next few years of warfare. Instead of Cleon, it was Nicias who suffered politically from having his bluff called and his timidity exposed. Plutarch argues that this misjudgement by Nicias had negative political consequences for Athens as well, making demagoguery such as Cleon's more politically acceptable, with the resultant coarsening of political discussion contributing to the city's later downfall.

Nicias quickly recovered from this loss of credibility by leading a force into Corinthian territory, where he carried out a number of raids before seizing the peninsula of Methone in the Argolis, between Troezen and Epidaurus. The isthmus was fortified and Nicias left a garrison in Methone. In 424 BC, he commanded the force which captured Cythera. This became an important base for operations against Laconia itself. The Athenians now held three key positions in the Peloponnese—Cythera, Methone, and Pylos.

During his years in command, Nicias was cautious, avoiding significant military engagement. According to Plutarch, this was to his benefit, as Nicias was able to avoid the worst of Athens' misfortunes, both military and political. Plutarch held that "Nicias declined all difficult and lengthy enterprises; if he took a command, he was for doing what was safe". However, Plutarch noted that, on the battlefield, Nicias was recognised as a fair combatant, fighting as courageously as any other soldier.

== "Champion of peace" (423–415 BC) ==
=== Truce of Laches ===
In 423, after a decade of fighting had left both sides exhausted, their respective anti-war factions sought to initiate peace talks. In Athens, there was increasing concern about the success of Sparta's most effective general, Brasidas, who was campaigning in Chalcidice, Thrace, and Macedonia. The Athenian general Laches, supported by Nicias, sought to counter this by calling on the ecclesia (assembly) to seek an armistice. His motion was carried. J. B. Bury argued that this policy was misguided. He supported Cleon's counter-argument that Athens should not have pursued peace "until the success of Brasidas had been decisively checked", and some degree of prestige restored. Bury said the resolve of the Athenians was undermined by Nicias and Laches, whose case rested on "the feelings of the hour", whereas Cleon called on them "to weigh considerations of policy".

However, this "Truce of Laches" had little impact on Brasidas and collapsed within a year. The town of Scione, in Chalcidice, revolted against Athens and swore allegiance to Brasidas. Soon afterwards, the neighbouring town of Mende followed suit. Brasidas was then needed to reinforce his ally Perdiccas against hostile Illyrians in Macedonia. While Brasidas was away, Athens sent Nicias to Chalcidice in command of a large relief force which recaptured Mende and besieged Scione.

=== Peace of Nicias ===
The fragile truce was finally ended when Cleon resolved to restore Athenian control of the town of Amphipolis, in Macedonia. In the ensuing Battle of Amphipolis, the Spartans routed the Athenians, but both Brasidas and Cleon were killed—thereby removing the key members of the pro-war factions on both sides. Thucydides wrote that this left Pleistoanax, of Sparta, and Nicias as "the foremost candidates for power in either city", and Bury said they were the "chief authors" of the treaty which followed. Each had their reasons for desiring peace—Pleistoanax sought restoration as King of Sparta, and Nicias wanted to be remembered by posterity as a capable and successful statesman who earned the affection of the Athenian people.

In March 421, Nicias and Pleistoanax concluded the truce known as the Peace of Nicias, which had a fixed term of fifty years. The essence of this treaty was a partial return to the pre-war situation in that most, but not all, wartime gains were to be forfeited. For example, Amphipolis would be restored to Athens, and Pylos to Sparta, while all prisoners-of-war were to be released. Athens would continue to collect tribute from states in the Delian Confederacy, but at the rates originally agreed by Aristides in the 470s. Many of Sparta's allies agreed to sign the peace, but Boeotia, Corinth, Elis, and Megara refused because some of their territorial claims were ignored. This meant the truce could not be expected to endure, and Bury wrote that "the diplomacy of Nicias was a complete failure, so far as it aimed at ensuring an abiding peace".

Problems arose the following year when Sparta's existing truce with Argos was about to expire, and an alliance between Argos and Athens was anticipated. Then, Amphipolis refused to accept Athenian rule. Sparta could not force Amphipolis to reconsider, and so Athens declined to meet its own treaty obligations. Sparta had a greater need for peace than Athens, and particularly desired the release of prisoners taken at the Battle of Sphacteria in 425. Nicias met with Spartan envoys and the two states agreed entrance into a defensive alliance. As a result, all captives were finally released, but Athens retained Cythera and Pylos as compensation for the loss of Amphipolis.

=== Opposition to Nicias ===
Cleon's position as the leading Athenian democrat was taken by a lamp-maker called Hyperbolos who, like Cleon, was harshly criticised by Thucydides and satirised by Aristophanes. Hyperbolos, as the main opponent of Nicias and the peace party, swiftly gained support in Athens among citizens disillusioned with the peace treaty. At the same time, the anti-Athenian war party in Sparta was recovering power.

The return to conflict was hastened by the rise to prominence of Alcibiades on Athens' democratic side. Although young, and of dubious morality, he was respected as both a soldier and an orator. In 420, he stood against Nicias for election as strategos (general). With the peace treaty discredited, Alcibiades won the vote, and immediately urged Athens to conclude the Argive alliance. Historians A. W. Gomme and Raphael Sealey believed, as Thucydides reported, that Alcibiades was "offended with the Lacedaemonians for having negotiated the treaty through Nicias and Laches, and having overlooked him on account of his youth".

Still endeavouring to preserve the treaty, Nicias led a diplomatic mission to Sparta. They could not agree on Sparta's alliance with Boeotia, or on the status of Amphipolis, and the mission failed, causing the return of Athens to a war footing. In 419 BC, Athens and Argos combined in an attack on Epidaurus, but Sparta intervened on behalf of Epidaurus, whereupon Athens declared that Sparta had broken the Peace of Nicias.

=== Battle of Mantinea ===
In 418, the political scene in Athens changed yet again, and Nicias was re-elected general at the expense of Alcibiades. Even so, the Argive alliance was maintained, until it was ultimately defeated in the same year at the Battle of Mantinea. Alcibiades had orchestrated an expansion of the alliance to include Elis, Mantinea, and other states in the Peloponnese, threatening Sparta's dominance in the region. Sparta had to respond, and King Agis II led the army into Argolis during the summer of 418. He was reinforced by contingents from Boeotia and Corinth.

Various machinations occurred for several weeks until Athens sent a force under generals Laches and Nicostratus into Arcadia, with the intention of capturing pro-Spartan Tegea. Nicias was excluded from the expedition because he opposed the Argive alliance. The Athenians encountered Agis outside Mantinea, where a closely-fought battle ensued. The Spartans had to recover from a grave tactical error which almost caused their defeat. That they were able to recover was because the Athenians failed to capitalise on their advantage—they failed to support their Argive allies when needed. Sparta went on to win the battle, killing both Athenian commanders. Thucydides asserted that Mantinea was "the greatest (battle) that had occurred for a very long while among the Hellenes".

The aftermath of the battle was equally important because an oligarchy seized power in Argos and terminated its alliance with Athens. Instead, Argos signed a new alliance with Sparta, whose military reputation had been restored. Other states including Achaea, Elis, and Mantinea followed suit, and Athens was once again isolated on the mainland.

=== Ostracism of Hyperbolos ===
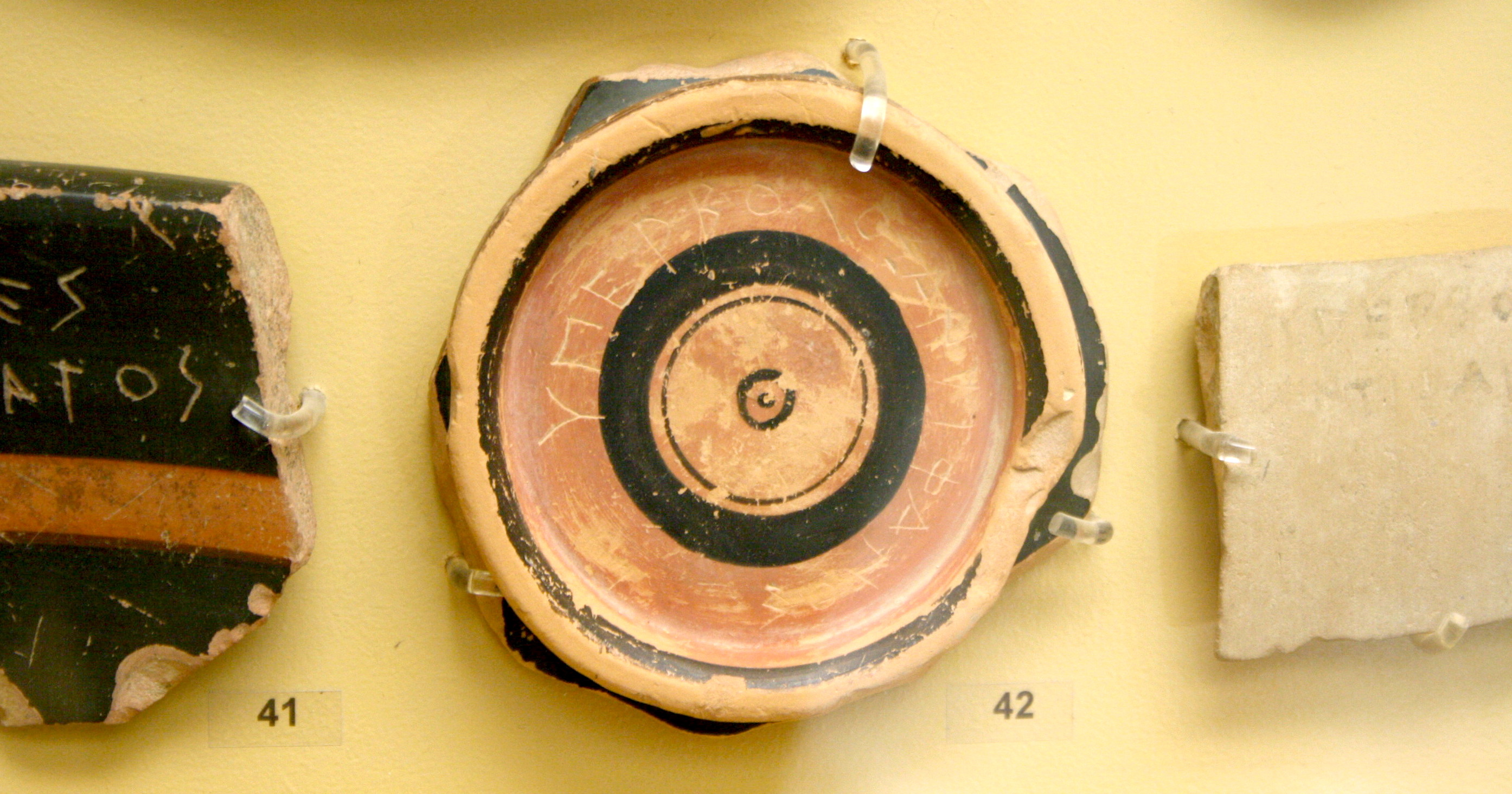
Ostracon against Hyperbolus (c.417 BC)

Mantinea was a disaster for Athens and, in 417, a complex power struggle developed between Hyperbolos on one side, and Nicias and Alcibiades on the other. Hyperbolos tried to bring about the ostracism of one of this pair, but Nicias and Alcibiades combined their influence to induce the people to expel Hyperbolos instead. This incident reveals that Nicias and Alcibiades each commanded a personal following, whose votes were determined by the wishes of the leaders. Plutarch was of the view that the Athenians were so angered by this cynical manoeuvring that the ostracism was never to be used again.

Bury observed that Nicias had hitherto been Athens' "champion of peace", but the machinations of Hyperbolos had brought him into co-operation, if not outright collaboration, with Alcibiades. Nicias was then roused to undertake fresh military enterprises, and he led an expedition to Chalcidice with the intention of retaking Amphipolis, but the attempt failed because Perdiccas, his supposed ally, changed sides. The expedition was abandoned.

== The Sicilian Expedition (415–413 BC) ==
=== Background ===
Athens had observed the development of Greek communities in Sicily and South Italy since the early years of the 5th century BC, but had not formed any definite policy on the regions other than, as always, to uphold the interests of Ionian colonies over those of the Dorians. In Sicily, however, the Dorian cities were powerful, especially the Corinthian sea-power of Syracuse. In 416, a war broke out between the Sicilian cities of Segesta (Egesta) and Selinus. Supported by democrats in Leontini, Segesta appealed to Athens for help. An embassy was sent to assess the situation and, in 415, the assembly debated whether to assist.

=== Preparations ===
Segesta had promised to finance a military expedition and, after the Athenian embassy reported that Segesta was a rich source of silver, Alcibiades led the calls for one to be mounted. Nicias opposed it but, recalling how he had suffered politically when Cleon called his bluff and took Sphacteria, did not state his opposition outright. Instead, he spoke of the enormous cost of a really efficient expedition, which would need to be large-scale in both troops and ships, and the fact that Athens would be entering unknown territory. Nicias believed that this would be enough to make his fellow Athenians reconsider and reject the plan. But instead they believed he had thrown his support behind it, and voted for it overwhelmingly.

Alcibiades's bid for the generalship won the support of the assembly, but they did not trust him with sole command. They decided that Lamachus and, disastrously in view of his opposition, Nicias, should accompany him. Bury points out that a similar compromise had brought disaster in 418. Hammond says that to send Nicias against his will, and in the company of Alcibiades, was "an act of military folly".

The expedition was ready to sail in the summer of 415. Initially, the fleet was to be sixty triremes but Nicias wanted substantially more. According to Plutarch, the increase was to "140 triremes, 5,100 hoplites, and about 1,300 archers, slingers, and light armed men". However, that contradicts Thucydides. He says there were 134 triremes, plus a host of attendant vessels carrying food, tools and tradesmen. He agrees with Plutarch that there were 5,100 hoplites, but says the total number of combatants was 30,000. Thucydides underlined his analysis with a comment translated by Crawley as: "Such was the strength of the first armament that sailed over for the war". Bury, however, translated this as: "no armament so magnificent had ever before been sent out by a single Greek state".

On arrival in Sicily, the Athenians discovered that their envoys had been tricked because Segesta was not at all rich. Even so, Nicias and his colleagues decided against abandoning the mission. Lamachus, a professional soldier, called for an immediate attack on Syracuse. Alcibiades wanted a diplomatic effort first, to win support from other Ionian cities, and Nicias, exercising his usual caution, called for sailing around Sicily, showing the flag as a gesture of support for Athens's allies Selinus and Egesta, then returning. He later leaned towards Alcibiades's position, which was the course chosen. A handful of additional Sicilian cities agreed to support the Athenians, but little was achieved militarily.

=== Recall of Alcibiades and death of Lamachus ===
Towards the end of 415, Athens recalled Alcibiades on accusations of impiety, a capital offence. Alciabides escaped his escort and went into exile. The assembly condemned him to death in absentia, and Alcibiades offered his services to Sparta. He convinced the Spartans that Athens planned to invade the Peloponnese after the army returned from Sicily. Sparta sent reinforcements to Syracuse under the command of their general Gylippus.

Alciabides' departure left Nicias in charge of the expedition's diplomatic and political activities. As usual, he put caution before enterprise, and no progress was made before winter. One inconclusive battle was fought after the Syracusans ventured to attack the Athenian base at Catania. Nicias and Lamachus decided to postpone the campaign through the winter, and sent a request for reinforcements to Athens. Meanwhile, Syracuse prepared for the inevitable siege, which began in the spring or early summer of 414. Lamachus launched a surprise attack from the coast to overrun the steep-sided Epipolae, a plateau north and north-west of Syracuse. The plan was to circumvallate the city on its northern side while blockading the Great Harbour, a large bay to the south. The vital part of Lamachus' plan was the northern arm of the wall across the Epipolae to the coast north of Syracuse. With the hills and the harbour under Athenian control, completion of the north wall would have isolated Syracuse. Anticipating this, the Syracusans hastily built defences which the Athenians attacked and destroyed. This forced the Syracusans back into the city but, disastrously for Athens, Lamachus was killed. That left Nicias in sole command of all operations.

=== "Gross neglect" ===
Crucially, Nicias neglected the northern arm of the wall to concentrate on the southern blockade, despite knowing that aid for Syracuse was coming from Sparta and the Peloponnese. When Gylippus arrived, he saw the urgent need for support from other Dorian cities, and successfully completed alliances with Gela, Himera, and Selinus. Realising the extent of Nicias' negligence, he led his followers through the northern gap on the Epipolae, and entered Syracuse unopposed. Gylippus shared command with his Syracusan counterpart Hermocrates, and immediately ordered construction of a northern cross-wall to maintain the gap. The move was a success and left the Athenians confined to the south, unable to prevent the flow of reinforcements in the north. Next, Gylippus captured the Epipolae, which he fortified far to the west. Failure to complete the northern wall was Nicias' greatest mistake—Bury said he was guilty of "gross neglect"; Hammond said the failure to intercept Gylippus was "a serious blunder".

Nicias compounded his error by remaining inactive through the winter of 414–413. His army and fleet held territory to the west and south of Syracuse, and Nicias was satisfied to remain in his headquarters on the fortified promontory of Plemmyrium (now Plemmirio), a few miles south of Syracuse. Gylippus, by contrast, was extremely busy. Knowing that the fleet was Athens' key advantage, he ordered the construction of ships throughout the winter. Over eighty were complete by spring. These Syracusan ships were smaller and more mobile than the Athenian triremes. Anticipating combat in the narrow space of the Great Harbour, the Syracusans built short, heavy vessels needing less space to manoeuvre. Meanwhile, more Sicilian and Peloponnesian contingents arrived to support Syracuse.

=== Appeal for reinforcements ===
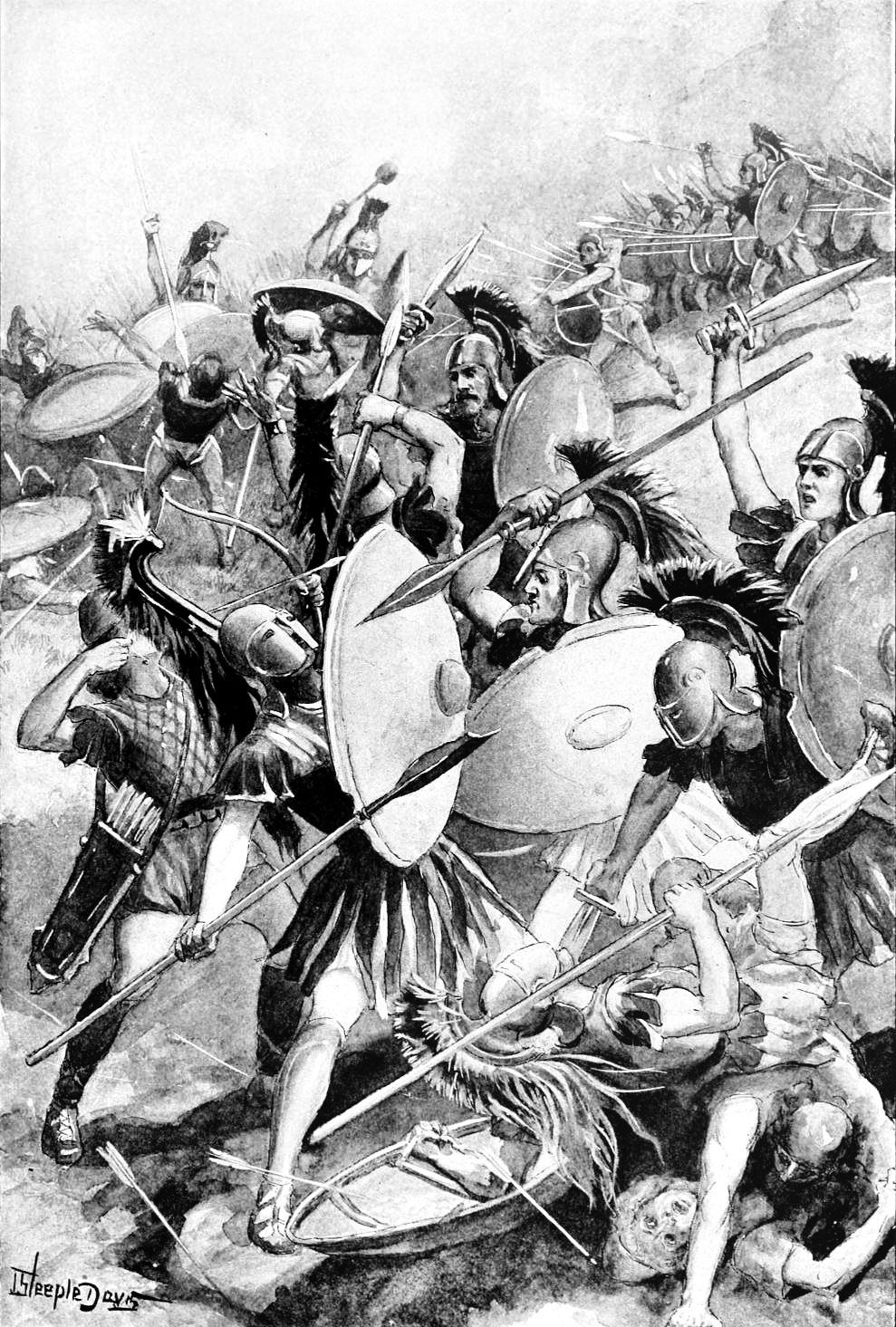
Destruction of the Athenian army at Syracuse

Nicias was aware of the Syracusan build-up and sent an urgent appeal to Athens for extra forces. The message was actually another ploy on his part to end the expedition while cutting Athens's losses. He described his own failing health, and said he now believed it impossible to take Syracuse. As he had in the initial debate, he hoped that this grim assessment of the situation, and the difficulty and cost of the needed reinforcements and their ships would be enough to persuade the assembly to recall the entire expedition, or at least him, allowing him to avoid responsibility for a decision that he could and should have taken on his own.

Nicias's gambit again backfired on him and Athens. The city decided to send a second expedition of 73 vessels and 5,000 troops, under the generals Demosthenes and Eurymedon, in spring 413. Before they arrived, Gylippus attacked Plemmyrium by land and sea. Athens won the naval clash, but lost Plemmyrium to Gylippus' army. Nicias led his land forces to their fortifications west of Syracuse and waited there for the reinforcements. Gylippus, however, was not waiting, and launched a second double offensive. This time, his army failed and his navy won—the new, mobile ships proving their suitability for the narrow waters of the Grand Harbour.

In August, the relief force arrived and Demosthenes immediately proposed a night attack on the Epipolae. This began well, but ended as a rout with heavy losses. Demosthenes declared that it was time for the Athenians to withdraw from Sicily. But, Nicias refused. He had been averse to attacking Syracuse in the first place when, unprepared, it could have been easily defeated; now, with victory out of the question, he would not leave because he feared disgrace.

=== Eclipse, capture, and execution ===
There was a delay until the arrival in Syracuse of another large contingent of reinforcements. Nicias then agreed that the Athenians must withdraw. On 27 August, the night of their proposed departure, there was a lunar eclipse. One characteristic of the pious Nicias was his blind faith in omens. He was foremost in pronouncing the eclipse as an evil omen, and again delayed the Athenian withdrawal, this time fatally.

On 3 September, the Syracusans and their allies attacked the Athenian fleet and won a great victory. Eurymedon was killed. With Athenian morale crushed, the Syracusans raised a boom across the mouth of the Great Harbour. The Athenians tried to break out, and the decisive battle was fought on 9 September. The fleet was comprehensively defeated, and the army had to withdraw inland. Hermocrates had managed to blockade most westward routes and, on 18 September, the Athenians were surrounded at the Assinaros river. Nicias surrendered to Gylippus, but the Spartan could not alter the intent of the Syracusans.

Large numbers of Athenians and their allies were massacred, others were enslaved, and some were imprisoned. Nicias and Demosthenes were among the latter, and soon they were both executed despite orders from Spartan commanders not to, hoping to be brought to Sparta.

== Final assessments ==
Having considered why the Syracusans killed Nicias, Thucydides said: "This or the like was the cause of the death of a man who, of all the Hellenes in my time, least deserved such a fate, seeing that the whole course of his life had been regulated with strict attention to virtue".

According to the Encyclopædia Britannica Eleventh Edition: "At all events it is clear that the management of so great an enterprise was a task far beyond his powers. He was a man of conventional respectability and mechanical piety, without the originality which was required to meet the crisis which faced him".

J. B. Bury held that the two main causes of Athens' Sicilian disaster were Nicias himself and the assembly which appointed him to command. Nicias was a pious conservative who invariably put caution first because he was indecisive, vacillating, and feared the consequences of failure. In Athens, all generals and politicians rose to power with the assent of the assembly, and Bury concludes his case by saying: "In estimating the character of the Athenian people, we must not forget their choice of this hero of conscientious indecision".

Nicholas Hammond said Nicias "paraded his sincere belief in oracles and omens" as the basis of his military successes to 415. Though Nicias should have been the political successor of Pericles, "he lacked the intellectual ability to lead the young aristocrats, and the spiritual qualities to fire the people as a whole".

James Tucci, a military historian at the U.S. Air Force's School of Advanced Air and Space Studies, made Nicias, particularly his decisions during the Sicilian Expedition, the subject of his entry in the 2022 anthology The Worst Military Leaders in History:

The strategic impact of Nicias's failure in leading the Sicilian Expedition was catastrophic, and Nicias clearly and repeatedly demonstrated the characteristics of an incompetent military commander. He failed to understand his situation, from beginning to end. He was inept at logistics, tactics and operations. He hesitated constantly, missing many golden opportunities to take advantage of Syracusan weakness and allowing the city to recover, to be reinforced and to turn the tide of near defeat into decisive victory. His indecisiveness was amplified by his fear of being blamed for the failure of the expedition. In the end, his incompetence did not just result in defeat on the battlefield, but in the annihilation of nearly every member of the Athenian army and fleet in Sicily, the flower of Athenian citizenry, a catastrophe that led to the fall of the Athenian Empire.

== Sources ==
- Bury, J. B. (1975). Meiggs, Russell (ed.). A History of Greece (4th ed.). Macmillan. ISBN 978-0-333-15493-9.
- Crawley, Richard, ed. (1874c) [431 BC]. Thucydides: Book III . Oxford University Press.
- Crawley, Richard, ed. (1874d) [431 BC]. Thucydides: Book IV . Oxford University Press.
- Crawley, Richard, ed. (1874e) [431 BC]. Thucydides: Book V . Oxford University Press.
- Crawley, Richard, ed. (1874f) [431 BC]. Thucydides: Book VI . Oxford University Press.
- Crawley, Richard, ed. (1874g) [431 BC]. Thucydides: Book VII . Oxford University Press.
- Gomme, A. W. (1963). A Historical Commentary on Thucydides. Oxford University Press.
- Hammond, Nicholas (1986). A History of Greece to 322 BC (3rd ed.). Oxford University Press. ISBN 978-0-198-73095-8.
- Plutarch (1859a) [90–120 AD]. Clough, Arthur Hugh (ed.). Life of Alcibiabes . Boston, Massachusetts: Little, Brown & Co.
- Plutarch (1859b) [90–120 AD]. Clough, Arthur Hugh (ed.). Life of Aristides . Boston, Massachusetts: Little, Brown & Co.
- Plutarch (1859c) [90–120 AD]. Clough, Arthur Hugh (ed.). Life of Nicias . Boston, Massachusetts: Little, Brown & Co.
- Sealey, Raphael (1976). A History of the Greek City States, 700–338 BC. University of California Press. ISBN 978-0-520-03177-7.
- Tucci, James (2022). "Nikias". In Jennings, John M.; Steele, Chuck (eds.). The Worst Military Leaders in History. London: Reaktion Books. ISBN 9781789145830.
