= Laches (general) =

Athenian aristocrat and general (c. 475–418 BCE)

- Native name: Λάχης Μελανώπου Αἰξωνευς
- Born: c. 475 BC
- Died: 418 BC (aged c. 57) Mantineia
- Allegiance: Athens
- Service years: 418 BC
- Conflicts: First Battle of Mantinea †

Laches (/ˈlækiːz/; Ancient Greek: Λάχης Μελανώπου Αἰξωνευς, romanized: Lachēs Melanōpou Aixōneus; c. 475 – 418 BCE) was an Athenian aristocrat (son of Melanopos) and general during the Peloponnesian War.

== Life ==
His date of birth is unknown, but Plato asserts that he was distinctly older than Socrates, who was born around 470 BCE. According to Thucydides, he was the son of Melanopus of Aexone. The family belonged to the Cecropis tribe.

In 427 BCE, Laches and Charoeades were sent to Sicily with a fleet of 20 ships in order to support Athenian allies against Syracuse. When Charoeades was killed by the Syracusans in battle in 426 BCE, Laches took over the supreme command of the fleet. Under his command, the army sailed to Mylae, a territory of Messana and was defended by two battalions of Messanians. The enemies tried to ambush the Athenians and when this failed, Laches was able to force the cities of Mylae and Messana to surrender. However, due to the annual reappointment of generals, at the beginning of 425 BCE he was replaced by Pythodoros as supreme commander. The first Athenian expedition to Sicily ended badly. Upon Laches' return to Athens he was prosecuted by Cleon, but was acquitted of any wrongdoing. His trial was satirized by Aristophanes in his play The Wasps, which is the main source for its historicity.

In 424 BCE, Laches negotiated a treaty of alliance with Halieis, a Spartan ally on the Argolid Peninsula, which the Athenians had been raiding since 425 BCE. This treaty allowed the Athenians to establish a garrison at Halieis and committed the Halieians to "do well to the Athenians as far as we can at every opportunity". In 423 BCE, Laches successfully moved for a one-year truce with Sparta in the Athenian Assembly. After Cleon died in 422 BCE, Laches, together with Nicias, was able to negotiate the Peace of Nicias. In 418 BCE, the peace broke down because of Athens's support for Spartan rebels. Laches was again appointed general and was killed in the Athenian defeat at the Battle of Mantinea.

The Platonic dialogue Laches features Laches as one of Socrates' main interlocutors.

== Others named Laches ==
Laches was a common name at Athens; the archon of 400/399 BCE, the year of Socrates' execution, was another Laches. Johannes Kirchner's Prosopographia Attica lists eighteen men of the name of Laches, including the general's son, grandson, and great-grandson, who appear in Demosthenes' speech against Timocrates and in his letters. There was also another Laches, son of Demochares, who was Demosthenes' cousin and brother-in-law, but he was of another deme and family. There was also a captain at the battle of Coronea (394 BCE); and an Athenian commander who fought (and lost to) Epaminondas in 364 BCE.

== See also ==
- List of speakers in Plato's dialogues
