= Battle of Tanagra (426 BC) =

Battle in the Pelopponesian War

- Part of the Peloponnesian War
Date	426 BC
Location	Tanagra
Result	Athenian victory

Belligerents
Athens	Tanagra; Thebes

Commanders and leaders
Nikias; Hipponikos; Eurymedon	Unknown

Strength
2,000 hoplites	Unknown

Casualties and losses
Unknown	Unknown

The Battle of Tanagra took place during the Peloponnesian War in 426 BC between Athens, Tanagra and Thebes.

In 426 Athens sent a fleet to the island of Melos consisting of 60 ships and 2,000 hoplites under the command of Nicias. Melos had refused to join the Delian League, and still refused to do so even when the Athenians plundered the island. The Athenians, however, dides landed on shore and marched towards Tanagra, where they were joined by the main Athenian army that had been marching from Athens under Hipponicus and Eurymedon. They plundered the countryside, and the next day defeated a combined Tanagran and Theban army, but returned to Athens after the victory.
