= Eurymedon (strategos) =

Athenian general (died 413 BC)

Eurymedon (/jʊəˈrɪmɪdɒn/; Greek: Εὐρυμέδων; died 413 BC) was one of the Athenian generals (strategoi) during the Peloponnesian War.

== Biography ==
In 428 BC, he was sent by the Athenians to intercept the Peloponnesian fleet, which was on its way to attack Corcyra. On his arrival, finding that Nicostratus, with a small squadron from Naupactus, had already secured the island on behalf of Athens, he took command of the combined fleet. Owing to the absence of the Peloponnesians, Eurymedon had no chance to distinguish himself.

In the following summer, in joint command of the Athenian land forces, he ravaged the district of Tanagra. In 425 BC, he was appointed, with Sophocles, the son of Sostratides, to the command of an expedition destined for Sicily. He stopped at Corcyra on the way, in order to assist the democratic party against the oligarchical exiles. However, Eurymedon took no steps to prevent the massacre of the oligarchical exiles. Afterwards, Eurymedon proceeded to Sicily.

Immediately after his arrival in Sicily a pact was proposed by the Syracusan general, Hermocrates, to which Eurymedon and Sophocles were induced to agree. The terms of the pact did not, however, satisfy the Athenians, who blamed its conclusion on bribery. As a result, two of the chief agents in the negotiations were banished, while Eurymedon was sentenced to pay a heavy fine.

In 413 BC Eurymedon, who had been sent with Demosthenes to reinforce the Athenians at the siege of Syracuse, was defeated and slain before reaching land (Thucydides iii., iv., vii.; Diodorus Siculus xiii. 8, 11, 13).
