= Demosthenes (general) =

5th-century BC Athenian military general

- Native name: Δημοσθένης
- Died: 413 BC Sicily
- Allegiance: Athens
- Service years: 426–413 BC
- Rank: General
- Conflicts: Peloponnesian War; Battle of Olpae; Battle of Pylos; Battle of Sphacteria; Sicilian Expedition (POW) (executed)

Demosthenes (Greek: Δημοσθένης, died 413 BC), son of Alcisthenes, was an Athenian general during the Peloponnesian War.

== Early military actions ==
The military activities of Demosthenes are first recorded from 426 BC when he led an Athenian invasion of Aetolia. This was a failure. Demosthenes lost about 120 Athenians along with his second-in-command, Procles. Demosthenes' allies also suffered heavy losses. As a result of this loss, Demosthenes did not return to Athens, fearing for his life. However, later that year, Ambracia invaded Acarnania. The Acarnanians sought help from Demosthenes, who was now patrolling the coast of the Ionian Sea with twenty Athenian ships. He landed at Olpae and defeated a Spartan army under Eurylochus, which had come to assist the Ambraciots. Eurylochus was killed in the Battle of Olpae and the Acarnanians and Ambraciots signed a peace treaty.

== Success in the Peloponnese ==
In 425 BC, while still with his fleet in the Ionian Sea, Demosthenes was ordered by Cleon to join a fleet sent from Athens to put down a revolt in Sicily. Due to a storm, Demosthenes instead landed at Pylos in the Peloponnese. In order to keep busy, his soldiers impulsively fortified the promontory, which was Demosthenes' wish however he had failed to persuade the other generals. This gave Athens a strong base close to Sparta, about 45 miles away. Sparta, meanwhile, landed an army on the nearby island of Sphacteria, and Demosthenes moved his men to the beach at Pylos to prevent the Spartans, commanded by Thrasymelidas and Brasidas, from landing there. The Spartan landing was repulsed, and the main Athenian fleet (having turned back from its journey to Sicily) arrived in time to chase off the Spartan ships. The engagement is known as the Battle of Pylos.

Back in Athens, the Spartans tried to negotiate a peace. This failed, and Cleon went to assist Demosthenes, who was planning an invasion of Sphacteria. The Athenian forces successfully attacked Sphacteria, forcing the Spartans to surrender – a very unusual event.

== Further action during the Peloponnesian War ==
In 424 BC, Demosthenes and Hippocrates attempted to capture Megara, but were defeated by Brasidas. Demosthenes then went to Naupactus to support the democratic revolution there and to gather troops for an invasion of Boeotia. Demosthenes and Hippocrates were unable to coordinate their attacks and Hippocrates was defeated at the Battle of Delium. Demosthenes instead attacked Sicyon and was defeated as well.

Demosthenes was one of the signatories of the Peace of Nicias in 421 BC, which ended the first half of the Peloponnesian War. (A different Demosthenes was also a signatory for Sparta.)

In 417 BC, Demosthenes was responsible for evacuating the Athenian troops from Epidaurus following the Battle of Mantinea. He is said to have organized athletic games and the Athenian troops escaped while the Epidaurans were distracted by the games.

== The Sicilian Expedition ==
After Athens invaded Sicily in 415 BC, a Spartan fleet arrived to reinforce their allies in Syracuse, with a stalemate ensuing. In 413 BC, Demosthenes and Eurymedon were sent with a new fleet of seventy-three ships and 5000 hoplites. Demosthenes landed his troops and led a bold night attack on Syracusan forces. After initial success, the Athenians became disorganized in what became a chaotic night operation, and were thoroughly routed by Gylippus, the Spartan commander.

After the defeat, and upon seeing the disease-ridden Athenian camp, Demosthenes suggested that they immediately give up the siege and return to Athens, where they were needed to defend the city against a Spartan invasion of Attica. Nicias, the Athenian commander in charge, at first refused until still more Spartans arrived. However, while preparing to leave, there was a lunar eclipse, which delayed the departure as this was considered a bad omen. The delay allowed the Syracusans and Spartans to trap the Athenian forces in the harbour and Eurymedon was killed in the ensuing battle.

The Spartans forced the Athenians to return their forces to the land. Demosthenes thought they could still flee by ship, but Nicias wanted to find refuge on land. After a few days of marching, Demosthenes and Nicias became separated; Demosthenes was ambushed by the Syracusans and was forced to surrender. Nicias was soon captured as well, and both were executed despite the contrary orders of Gylippus, who had hoped Demosthenes and Nicias could be brought back to Sparta as prisoners.

== A character in an Aristophanes play ==
Demosthenes was also a character in The Knights by Aristophanes. Along with Nicias, he is a slave who overthrows "the Paphlagonian," a character representing Cleon. The characters in the play were based on the real people, who were contemporaries of Aristophanes.
