= Hermocrates =

5th-century BC Syracusan politician and strategos

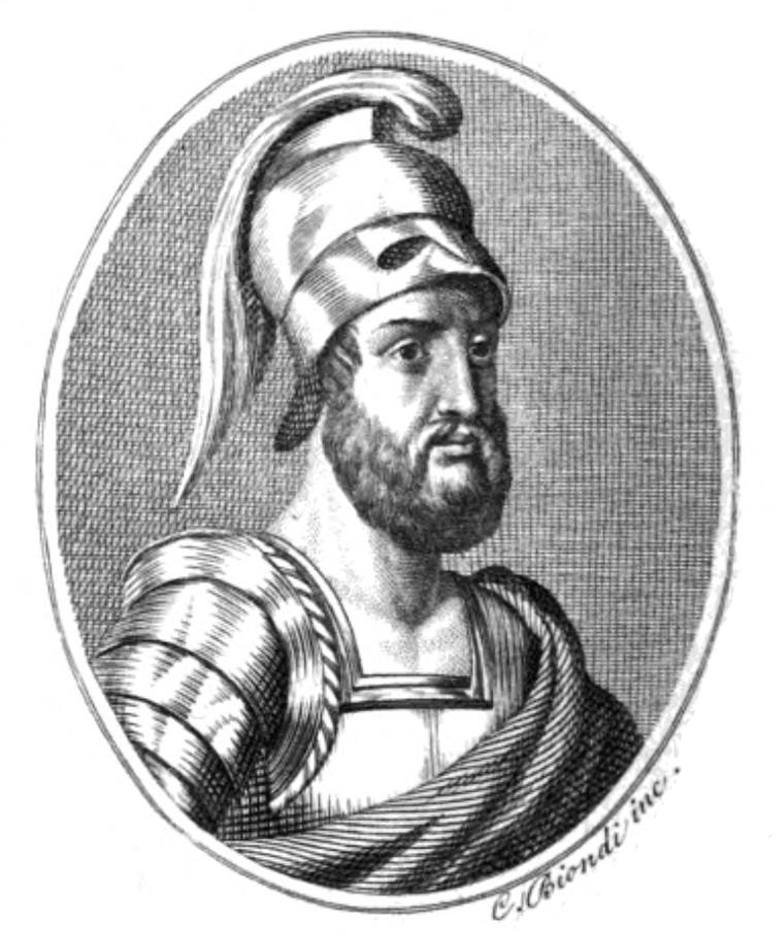
- Native name: Ἑρμοκράτης
- Born: before c. 432
- Died: c. 407 BC
- Allegiance: Syracuse
- Rank: Strategos; Navarch
- Conflicts: Peloponnesian War; Sicilian Expedition; Battle of Cyzicus; Sicilian Wars
- Children: Dionysius I of Syracuse

Hermocrates (/hɜːrˈmɒkrəˌtiːz/; Ancient Greek: Ἑρμοκράτης, romanized: Hermokrátēs, c. 5th century – 407 BC) was an ancient Syracusan general from Greek Sicily during the Athenians' Sicilian Expedition in the midst of the Peloponnesian War. He is also remembered as a character in the Timaeus and Critias dialogues of Plato and father of Dionysius.

== Life ==
Not much is known about Hermocrates in his early years. However, in 432 BC, he became the father of Dionysius I, who would later become the Tyrant of Syracuse. Another early mention of Hermocrates is by Thucydides, where he appears at the congress of Gela in 424 BC giving a speech demanding the Sicilian Greeks stop their quarrelling and unite against the Athenians, who had been attacking the Sicilian cities for supporting Corinth.

When Athens sent an armada to conquer Sicily in 415, Hermocrates called for expanding the anti-Athens coalition, and sent ambassadors to Sparta, Corinth, Carthage, and Italy seeking allies. The Athenians were able to establish a base at Catana, and had defeated the Syracusans at the river Anapus. Hermocrates called for extending his cities' fortifications and was able to do away with the traditional fifteen general system, instead calling for three to lead the war effort instead. He was elected as one of Syracuse's three strategoi, along with Heracleides and Sicanus. He was also able to convince the Athenian allied Camarians to remain neutral in the war. Due to his lack of success in the battlefield, he was dismissed from this position as strategoi, but he later became one of the most important advisers to the Spartan general Gylippus after he had arrived in Sicily. He now commanded a contingent of Syracusan soldiers and together with Gylippus, achieved victory over Athens during its siege of Syracuse. After the Athenian force was defeated, Hermocrates called for the prisoners of war to be treated kindly, but this was ignored.

In 412 BC, Syracuse sent ships east to assist their Spartan allies in an attack on the Athenians. Hermocrates was made an admiral and lead the Syracusan ships in several skirmishes against Athenians ships, but was utterly defeated during the Battle of Cyzicus. Sparta and their allies were routed and Hermocrates was banned in absentia by political rivals back in Syracuse, being blamed for the defeat.

While he remained in exile, tensions between the Sicilian city Selinunte and their Athenian allied rival Segesta, broke out into war. Segesta, unable to call on Athens for help, instead asked Carthage for assistance and in 410 BC, Hannibal Mago launched an invasion of Sicily. Hermocrates organized an army and was able to push back the Carthaginians, but in Syracuse, riots broke out along political lines between those who supported Hermocrates, and those who denounced him, saying that his ultimate aim was tyranny. He was killed in a street fight in 407 BC.

== Other literary appearances ==
Hermocrates is one of the persons appearing in Plato's dialogues Timaeus and Critias. Plato originally might have planned a third dialogue named Hermocrates, but failed to compose it. F. M. Cornford writes:

Since the dialogue that was to bear his name was never written, we can only guess why Plato chose him. It is curious to reflect that, while Critias is to recount how the prehistoric Athens of nine thousand years ago had repelled the invasion from Atlantis and saved the Mediterranean peoples from slavery, Hermocrates would be remembered by the Athenians as the man who had repulsed their own greatest effort at imperialist expansion.

Hermocrates is also mentioned by Xenophon, Plutarch, and Polyaenus.

Hermocrates appears as a character in the novel Chaereas and Callirhoe written by the ancient Greek author Chariton. In the novel he appears as the father of Callirhoe, one of the main characters in the story.

== See also ==
- List of speakers in Plato's dialogues

== Bibliography ==
- Cornford, F. M. (1937). Plato's Cosmology. London: Lund Humphries. ISBN 0-87220-386-7.
- Marchant, E. C. (1933). "The Speech of Hermocrates". The Classical Review. 47 (2). Cambridge University Press: 65–66. doi:10.1017/s0009840x00061540. JSTOR 701642. S2CID 162147306.
- Westlake, H. D. (1958). "Hermocrates the Syracusan". Bulletin of the John Rylands Library. 41: 239–68. doi:10.7227/BJRL.41.1.9.
