= Eurylochus (Spartan general) =

Spartan general

Eurylochus (Ancient Greek: Εὐρύλοχος) was a Spartan general during the Peloponnesian War. He commanded the Spartan and Ambraciot forces at the Battle of Olpae in 426 BCE, and was killed there.

== Sparta's campaign in Western Greece ==
Six years into the Peloponnesian War, in 426 BCE, the Spartans were invited by their Aetolian allies to attack and seize Naupactus, a major naval base belonging to their mutual enemy, the Athenian Empire. Encouraged by a recent defeat of the Athenians under their general Demosthenes in Aetolia, the Spartans agreed to invade the region, and brought an army of three thousand under the command of Eurylochus into central Greece. However, Demosthenes was able to organize the reinforcement of Naupactus's defences before the arrival of the Spartans, who therefore chose not to attack the city after all. Instead, Eurylochus, persuaded by another local ally, Ambracia, decided to join forces with the Ambraciots and wage a campaign against the latter's enemies, Amphilochia and Acarnania, hoping by conquering these regions to gain a major strategic advantage against the Athenians in mainland Greece.

The Ambraciots attacked Amphilochia in the autumn and seized the fortress of Olpae, not far from Amphilochian Argos, the region's capital. Eurylochus marched his Spartan troops north from Aetolia to meet up with the Ambraciots at Olpae, and successfully evaded an Acarnanian force sent to intercept him. After joining with the Ambraciots, Eurylochus encamped at Amphilochian Metropolis, a site in the vicinity of Olpae. However, before the Spartan-Ambraciot army could attack Argos, the Athenian general Demosthenes arrived at Olpae by sea with a small force, and was given command of the Acarnanian troops. The army of Demosthenes now confronted that of Eurylochus.

== Eurylochus at the Battle of Olpae ==
The two armies faced each other on either side of a dry riverbed for several days. Eurylochus was waiting for further Ambracian reinforcements, but when five days had passed without any sign of these, he chose to attack, a decision which has been harshly judged by historians.

In the ensuing Battle of Olpae, Eurylochus led his army's left wing, which outflanked the army's opposite wing. However, Demosthenes had prepared an ambush of Acarnanian troops, which proceeded to attack the rear of Eurylochus's wing, causing a rout of the Spartan forces. By nightfall, Eurylochus, along with his fellow Spartan general Macarius, was dead, and the Athenians had won a decisive victory. Eurylochus was succeeded as commander of the remaining Spartan forces by Menedaius.
