= Battle of Olpae =

Battle during the Peloponnesian War (426 BC)

Coordinates: 38°57′00″N 21°08′59″E

- Part of the Peloponnesian War
| Date | 426 BC |
| Location | Olpae |
| Result | Athenian victory |

Belligerents
| Athens; Amphilochia; Akarnanian League | Sparta; Ambrakia |

Commanders and leaders
| Demosthenes | Eurylochus †; Menedaios |

Strength
| 10,000 | 5,000 |

Casualties and losses
| About 300 | About 1,000 |
- Location within Greece

The Battle of Olpae took place during the Peloponnesian War in 426 BC, between armies led by Athens and Sparta.

In 426, 3,000 hoplites from Ambracia invaded Amphilochian Argos in Acarnania on a gulf of the Ionian Sea and occupied the fort of Olpae. The Acarnanians asked for help from both the Athenian general Demosthenes, and the 20 Athenian ships located nearby under the command of Aristotle and Hierophon. The Ambraciots asked for help from Eurylochus of Sparta, who managed to march his army past the Acarnanians without being observed. After this, Demosthenes arrived in the gulf below Olpae with his ships, 200 hoplites, and 60 archers. He joined with the Acarnanian army and set up camp in a ravine opposite Eurylochus, where both sides made preparations for five days. As the Ambraciot and Peloponnesian army was larger, Demosthenes set up an ambush with 400 hoplites from Acarnania, to be used when the battle began.

Demosthenes formed the right wing of the Athenian-led army with Athenian and Messenian troops, with the centre and left wing formed by the Acarnanians and Amphilochians. Eurylochus formed the left wing of his army, directly facing Demosthenes, with the Ambraciots and Mantineans forming the rest of the line. When the battle began, Eurylochus quickly outflanked Demosthenes and was about to surround him when the Acarnanians began their ambush, causing panic among the other troops when Eurylochus was killed. The Ambraciots defeated the left wing of the Acarnanians and Amphilochians, chasing them back to Argos, but they were themselves defeated by the rest of the Acarnanians when they returned. Demosthenes lost about 300 men, but emerged victorious when the battle was completed later that night.

The next day, Menedaius, who had taken command when Eurylochus was killed, attempted to arrange a truce with Demosthenes. Demosthenes would only allow the leaders of the army to escape. This was psychological warfare by Demosthenes "...to discredit the Lacedaemonians and Peloponnesians with the Hellenes in those parts, as traitors and self-seekers". However, some of the Ambraciots attempted to flee with Menedaius and the other commanders. The Acarnanians chased them, allowed Menedaius to escape as agreed, and killed about 200 Ambraciots.

The surviving Ambraciots and Peloponnesians fled into neighboring territory, where they found refuge with Salynthius, king of the Agraeans, who provided them shelter.

Meanwhile, Demosthenes learned that a second army from Ambracia was marching towards Olpae. These Ambraciots set up camp on the road to the fort at Idomene, having no knowledge of the defeat of the previous day. Demosthenes surprised them there at night, pretending to be the other Ambraciot army, and killed most of them; the rest fled to the hills or into the sea where they were captured by the 20 Athenian ships. Overall, the Ambraciots lost about 1,000 men over the two days.

Although Demosthenes could have easily taken Ambracia, he did not, because his allies feared a strong Athens in that region and so the Acarnanians and Ambraciots signed a 100-year peace treaty with them.
