= 429 BC =

429 BC in various calendars
- Gregorian calendar: 429 BC; CDXXIX BC
- Ab urbe condita: 325
- Ancient Egypt era: XXVII dynasty, 97
- Pharaoh: Artaxerxes I of Persia, 37
- Ancient Greek Olympiad (summer): 87th Olympiad, year 4
- Assyrian calendar: 4322
- Balinese saka calendar: N/A
- Bengali calendar: −1022 – −1021
- Berber calendar: 522
- Buddhist calendar: 116
- Burmese calendar: −1066
- Byzantine calendar: 5080–5081
- Chinese calendar: 辛亥年 (Metal Pig); 2269 or 2062 — to — 壬子年 (Water Rat); 2270 or 2063
- Coptic calendar: −712 – −711
- Discordian calendar: 738
- Ethiopian calendar: −436 – −435
- Hebrew calendar: 3332–3333
- Hindu calendars
- Vikram Samvat: −372 – −371
- Shaka Samvat: N/A
- Kali Yuga: 2672–2673
- Holocene calendar: 9572
- Iranian calendar: 1050 BP – 1049 BP
- Islamic calendar: 1082 BH – 1081 BH
- Javanese calendar: N/A
- Julian calendar: N/A
- Korean calendar: 1905
- Minguo calendar: 2340 before ROC 民前2340年
- Nanakshahi calendar: −1896
- Thai solar calendar: 114–115
- Tibetan calendar: ལྕགས་མོ་ཕག་ལོ་ (female Iron-Boar) −302 or −683 or −1455 — to — ཆུ་ཕོ་བྱི་བ་ལོ་ (male Water-Rat) −301 or −682 or −1454

Year 429 BC was a year of the pre-Julian Roman calendar. At the time, it was known as the Year of the Consulship of Tricipitinus and Fidenas (or, less frequently, year 325 Ab urbe condita). The denomination 429 BC for this year has been used since the early medieval period, when the Anno Domini calendar era became the prevalent method in Europe for naming years.

== Events ==
=== By place ===
==== Greece ====
- The Athenians under Xenophon march into Thrace to attack Chalcis. They destroy crops outside Spartolus and begin negotiating with pro-Athenian factions in Chalcis, but the anti-Athenian factions ask for help from Olynthus. An army from Chalcis, Spartolus, and Olynthus meet the Athenians in battle, but their hoplites are defeated. Reinforcements soon arrive from Olynthus, and they launch a second attack on the Athenians. The Athenians are routed, with all of their generals and 430 other men killed.
- The Athenian admiral Phormio has two naval victories, the Naupactus and the Battle of Rhium at the mouth of the Corinthian Gulf. In the first battle, his 20 ships defeat 47 Corinthian ships commanded by Machaon, Isocrates, and Agatharchidas that were advancing to reinforce the Spartan general, Cnemus's campaign in Acarnania. In the second battle, Phormio routs Cnemus's 77-vessel fleet.
- The Athenians, in alliance with Polichne, destroy the Cretan city of Kydonia.
- The Macedonian king, Perdiccas II, once again betrays the Athenians and sends 1000 troops to support a Spartan assault on Acarnania but they arrive too late to help. In response to this, King Sitalkes of Thrace invades Macedonia with a vast army that includes independent Thracian tribes (such as the Dii) and Paionian tribes (Agrianes and Laeaeans). His progress is slowed when the promised support from Athens fails to materialise. So Perdiccas once again uses diplomacy to ensure the survival of Macedonia. He promises the hand of his sister in marriage to the nephew of Sitalkes, who then persuades Sitalkes to leave Macedonia.
- The plague in Athens that is killing thousands of the city's inhabitants, claims Pericles. Cleon, who has headed the opposition to Pericles's rule, succeeds to power in Athens following Pericles's death.

== Births ==
- Ateas, king of Scythia (d. 339 BC)

== Deaths ==
- Pericles, Athenian statesman (epidemic) (born c. 495 BC)
