= Battle of Rhium =

Naval battle between Athenian and Peloponnesian fleets (429 BC)

Coordinates: 38°18′N 21°47′E

- Part of the Peloponnesian War
Date	429 BC
Location	The mouth of the Corinthian Gulf, near present-day Rio, Greece
Result	Athenian victory

Belligerents
Athens	Sparta; Korinth

Commanders and leaders
Phormion	Machaon; Isokrates; Agatharchidas

Strength
20 triremes	47 triremes, some being used as transports

Casualties and losses
None	12 ships captured, with most of their crews

The Battle of Rhium (429 BC) or the battle of Chalcis was a naval battle in the Peloponnesian War between an Athenian fleet commanded by Phormio and a Peloponnesian fleet composed of contingents from various states, each with its own commander. The battle came about when the Peloponnesian fleet, numbering 47 triremes, attempted to cross over to the northern shore of the Gulf of Patras to attack Acarnania in support of an offensive in northwestern Greece; Phormio's fleet attacked the Peloponnesians while they were making the crossing.

In the battle, the Peloponnesian ships, hampered by the fact that many of them were equipped not as fighting vessels but as transports, circled together in a defensive posture. Phormio, taking advantage of his crews' superior seamanship, sailed around the clustered Peloponnesians with his ships, driving the Peloponnesians closer and closer together until they began to foul oars and collide with each other. The Athenians then suddenly attacked, routing the Peloponnesians and capturing 12 ships.

== Prelude ==
The summer of 429 BC was marked by a Peloponnesian offensive in the Greek northwest. The Spartans and their allies hoped to knock several Athenian allies such as Acarnania, Zacynthus, and Cephallenia out of the war, and if possible to capture the Athenian base at Naupactus. The Spartan navarch Cnemus was placed in command of the campaign. He set out against Acarnania with 1,000 hoplites from Sparta, crossing over the Corinthian Gulf unnoticed by the Athenian fleet under Phormio. Combining his forces with 2,000 troops sent from allied states, Cnemus moved against the Acarnanian city of Stratus. The Acarnanians appealed to Phormio for help, but he refused to leave Naupactus undefended.

The Peloponnesian fleet, meanwhile, was charged with ferrying troops to the southern coast of Acarnania to prevent the residents of that area from supporting their allies inland. As the Peloponnesians moved westward along the south coast of the Gulf of Corinth, the Athenian fleet followed them on the northern shore. The Peloponnesians, with 47 ships, were not particularly concerned about the 20 Athenian ships across the gulf, but they nonetheless left their moorings at night to pass through the strait between Rhium and Cape Antirrhium, hoping to give their pursuers the slip. This ruse failed, as the Athenians noticed the move and gave chase, catching the Peloponnesians in the open water of the Gulf of Patras.

== Battle ==
Phormio's tactic: The Athenians (red) sail around the circled Peloponnesian ships (black). The Athenians risk a sudden attack by exposing their flanks to the enemy, but by compressing the Peloponnesian circle they cause confusion among the inexperienced Peloponnesian crews.

Although the Peloponnesian fleet was numerically superior to the Athenian, many of its ships were rigged out as transports instead of fighting vessels. Thus, as the Athenian fleet approached them, the Peloponnesian commanders (the names of all of these are not known, but the Corinthian commanders were Machaon, Isocrates, and Agatharchidas) ordered their 47 triremes to draw into a circle, prows outward, for defense. In the center of the circle were gathered the smaller ships and the five fastest triremes, which were to plug any gap that opened in the circle.

Phormio chose to attack this formation by using a risky and unorthodox tactic. He led his ships, in line, in a tightening circle around the Peloponnesians, darting inwards at times to drive the defending ships closer to each other. This tactic left the Athenians highly vulnerable to a swift attack, as any of the defending ships would only have to move a short distance straight ahead to ram a circling Athenian ship in the side. No such attack materialized, however, and the Peloponnesians were driven closer and closer together.

At this point, Phormio was aided by his experience with the local weather patterns, which had taught him that a wind usually blew out of the gulf at dawn. Expecting that this wind would severely discomfort the inexperienced Peloponnesians but not interfere at all with the work of his own more experienced crews, he waited for the moment it arose to attack. As expected, when the wind blew up the Peloponnesian ships were driven together; confusion reigned in the circle, with steersmen shouting and cursing, oars fouling between ships, and crews attempting to shove off from each other's ships with poles. At this moment the Athenians rushed in to attack. The rout was instant and total; the Peloponnesians, in their short flight to the southern shore, saw 12 of their ships, with their crews, captured by the pursuing Athenians.

== Aftermath ==
The Peloponnesian fleet retreated to Cyllene where it met up with Cnemus, who was retreating from a defeat by the Stratians. This double defeat seriously embarrassed Cnemus, and was in general an embarrassing failure for the Spartans; their first attempt at an amphibious offensive had ended in ignominy. The victory did not, however, put an end to the Peloponnesian offensive in the Gulf. Within a short period of time the Spartans were able to assemble a substantially larger fleet, this time of 77 triremes; Athens, meanwhile, though it dispatched 20 ships to reinforce Phormio, sent them by way of Crete. Thus, Phormio's 20 ships were forced to fight on their own, and only narrowly preserved Athenian dominance in the gulf at the Battle of Naupactus.
