= Glyfa =

Glyfa (Greek: Γλύφα) may refer to the following places in Greece:

- Glyfa, Paros, a village in the island of Paros, Cyclades
- Glyfa, Elis, a village in the municipal unit Vartholomio, Elis
- Glyfa, Phthiotis, a village in the municipal unit Pelasgia, Phthiotis
