= Kefalonia (ship) =

Greek ropax ferry

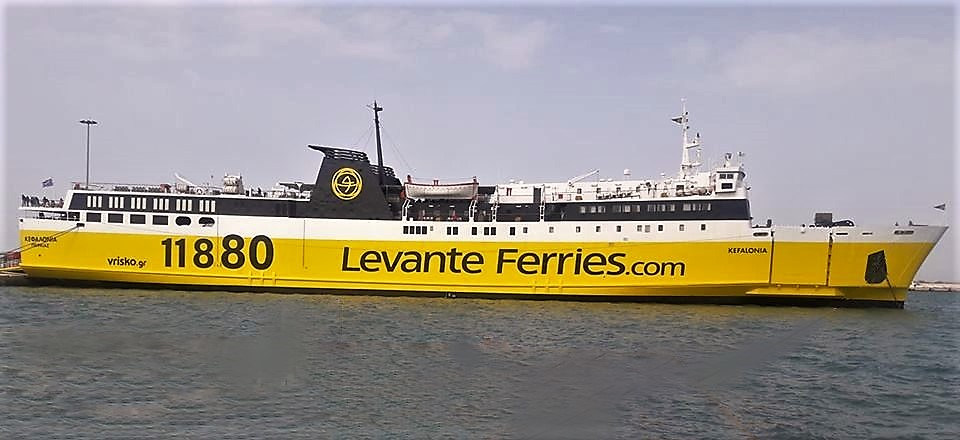
- Kefalonia in the port of Kyllini

History
- Name: (1975–1995): Venus; (1995–2013): Kefalonia; (2013–2018): Nissos Kefalonia; (2018–present): Kefalonia
- Owner: (1975–1995): Higashi Nippon Ferry; (1995–2000): Strintzis Lines; (2000–2004): Attica Group; (2004–2013): Strintzis Ferries; (2013–2018): Kefalonian Lines; (2018–present): Levante Ferries
- Operator: (1975–1995): Higashi Nippon Ferry; (1995–2000): Strintzis Lines; (2000–2004): Blue Star Ferries; (2004–2012): Strintzis Ferries; (2013–2018): Kefalonian Lines; (2019–present): Levante Ferries
- Port of registry: (1975–1995): Japan; (1995–present): Piraeus, Greece
- Route: Kyllini – Zakynthos / Kyllini – Poros (Kefalonia)
- Builder: Naikai Zosen (Setoda, Japan)
- Yard number: 395
- Completed: 1975
- Acquired: 1995 (by Strintzis Lines)
- Maiden voyage: 1975
- In service: 1975
- Identification: IMO number: 7426045; Call sign: SWKJ; MMSI number: 239386000
- Status: In service
- Notes: Underwent a major conversion in Perama following her acquisition from Japan in 1995.

General characteristics (following 1995 rebuild)
- Tonnage: 3,924 GT; 1,713 DWT
- Length: 120.78 m (396 ft 3 in)
- Beam: 17.20 m (56 ft 5 in)
- Draft: 5.2 m (17 ft 1 in)
- Installed power: 2 × Pielstick-NKK 14PC2-2V-400 diesel engines (10,300 kW / 14,000 BHP)
- Propulsion: Twin screw
- Speed: 20.0 knots (service); 21.5 knots (max)
- Capacity: 1,134 passengers; 226 cars; 405 lane metres

Kefalonia is a ferry operated by the Greek company Levante Ferries, which entered service in 1975 as Venus. It has been operating on the Poros to Kyllini route since 2018.

== Service ==
The ferry, launched on May 24, 1975 at the Naikai Zosen Corporation Taguma Works shipyard in Innoshima under the name Venus (びなす) and delivered on August 7 to the Japanese Higashi Nihon Ferry, entered service in the same year on the routes between Hachinohe and Tomakomai.

In 1979 it was transferred to the Aomori - Hakodate service, where it operated until 1987, when it took up service on the Aomori - Muroran service .

In March 1995 she was sold to the Greek company Strintzis Lines and, renamed Kefalonia, she underwent major refitting works in the Perama shipyard, after which, on 7 July she entered service on the routes between Patras, Sami and Vathi.

In 2000, with the acquisition of Strintzis Lines by Attica Group, the ferry was transferred to the Blue Ferries brand, continuing to operate on the same route.

In early 2004 it was transferred to Blue Star Ferries, also part of the Attica Group.

On 23 August 2004 she ran aground during mooring operations at Vathi, following the failure of a bow thruster. In the same month she was sold to the newly formed Strintzis Ferries, for which she returned to operate on the Patras, Kefalonia and Ithaca routes following her delivery in the following November.

On 10 July 2011 she was transferred to the Killini - Kefalonia service, exchanging with her fleetmate Eptanisos. On 29 December 2011, with the cessation of the Greek company's activities, the ferry was decommissioned together with Eptanisos in Drapetsona.

On 28 March 2012, after about a year and a half of lay-up and despite numerous rumours that the ferry had been sold for scrapping, it was purchased by the newly formed Kefalonian Lines.

Renamed Nissos Kefalonia, it returned to service on 25 April on the routes between Killini, Argostoli and Poros. In the same year, it also returned to operating occasionally on the routes between Killini and Zakynthos and Killini, Kefalonia and Ithaca. From 2016 to 2017 it was used only on the connections between Killini and Kefalonia. At the end of the year, it was transferred to the connections between Patras, Kefalonia, Ithaca and Killini.

At the end of the 2018 summer season she was sold to Levante Ferries and, after undergoing major refits again, on 27 March 2019 she was renamed Kefalonia and shortly afterwards returned to service on the routes between Killini and the islands of Kefalonia and Zakynthos.

In 2020 it was again transferred to the connections between Patras, Ithaca, Kefalonia and Killini, in which it had already operated until a few years earlier for Kefalonian Lines. In 2025 it returned to operating exclusively on the connections between Patras, Kefalonia and Ithaca.

== Accidents and Incidents ==
On 1 April 2023, during morning docking maneuvers at the port of Kyllini, Kefalonia made minor contact with the bow of the moored ferry Fior Di Levante. Kefalonia was arriving from Poros, Cephalonia, carrying 130 passengers, 19 cars, and 14 trucks, while Fior Di Levante was empty.

All passengers and vehicles disembarked safely, and no injuries, water ingress, or marine pollution occurred. The Kyllini Port Authority launched a preliminary investigation and initially issued a detention order for both vessels. Following an extraordinary survey by the Local Ship Inspection Team and the presentation of a certificate of class maintenance from its classification society,Kefalonia was cleared of any major damage and subsequently allowed to resume its scheduled itineraries.
