= Levante Ferries =

Greece-based ferry company

- Industry: Shipping
- Founded: 2014
- Founder: George Theodosis
- Headquarters: Athens, Greece
- Area served: Ionian Sea
- Key people: G. Theodosis
- Services: Passenger transportation Freight transportation
- Website: levanteferries.com

Levante Ferries is a Greek-based ferry company which was established in 2014. Today, a fleet of four ferries serves the transportation needs of the islands Zakynthos, Cephalonia and Ithaca.

== Routes ==
Currently, Levante Ferries is operating lines in Zante, Cephalonia and Ithaca islands. The company also operated a route between Thessaloniki and İzmir in Autumn 2022, but it was eventually stopped due to lack of demand. The operating routes are:

=== Ionian Sea ===
- Zante–Killini–Zante (Mare Di Levante)
- Poros–Killini–Poros (Fior Di Levante)
- Sami–Ithaca–Sami–Patras–Sami–Ithaca–Sami (Andreas Kalvos)

== Current fleet ==
Ship	Flag	Built	Entered Service	Gross tonnage	Length	Width	Passengers	Vehicles	Knots	Photos
Fior Di Levante	(Greece)	1998	2014	9.024 GT	118,8 m	20 m	1.140	300	Max(19kn), Operating(17kn)	
Mare di Levante	(Greece)	1984	2016	4.058 GT	120,2 m	21 m	1.068	350	Max(18kn), Operating(16kn)	
Kefalonia	(Greece)	1975	2019	3.924 GT	120,8 m	17.2 m	1.134	220	Max(22.5kn), Operating(19kn)	
Andreas Kalvos	(Greece)	1985	2019	1.765 GT	100 m	16,2 m	730	225	Max(18kn), Operating(16kn)	
Smyrna di Levante	(Greece)	1977	2022	14.205 GT	158,4 m	21,6 m	948	300	Max(20kn), Operating(18kn)	

== Future fleet ==
Ship	Flag	Built	Will Enter Service	Gross tonnage	Length	Width	Passengers	Vessels	Knots	Notes
Contessa di Levante	(Greece)	1999	?	4.945 GT	140,8 m	20,5 m	1.300	430	24 (max)	ex-Queen Coral 8

=== Notes ===
- Fior Di Levante won the award for the integrity and creativity of the total design, both inside and outside, including the company branding at the 14th Annual Ferry Shipping Conference which was held on 13–15 April 2016.
- Fior Di Levante is the first ship in Greece that receives electricity at night from the shore based installation at the port of Kyllini.
- Mare Di Levante is the second ship of Levante Ferries. Before being bought by Levante Ferries it was called Ionian Star and it belonged to Tyrogalas ferries operating in the same routes as it does now.
- Andreas Kalvos is the third ship of Levante Ferries. Before being bought by Levante Ferries it belonged to Zante Ferries and was operating with the same name it has now.
- Kefalonia is the fourth ship of Levante Ferries. Before being bought by Levante Ferries it belonged to Kefalonian Lines. Kefalonia operated for more than 20 years in the route Patra-Sami-Ithaca which made it really favorable in the people of Kefalonia and Ithaca.
