= Smyrna di Levante =

Ropax ferry

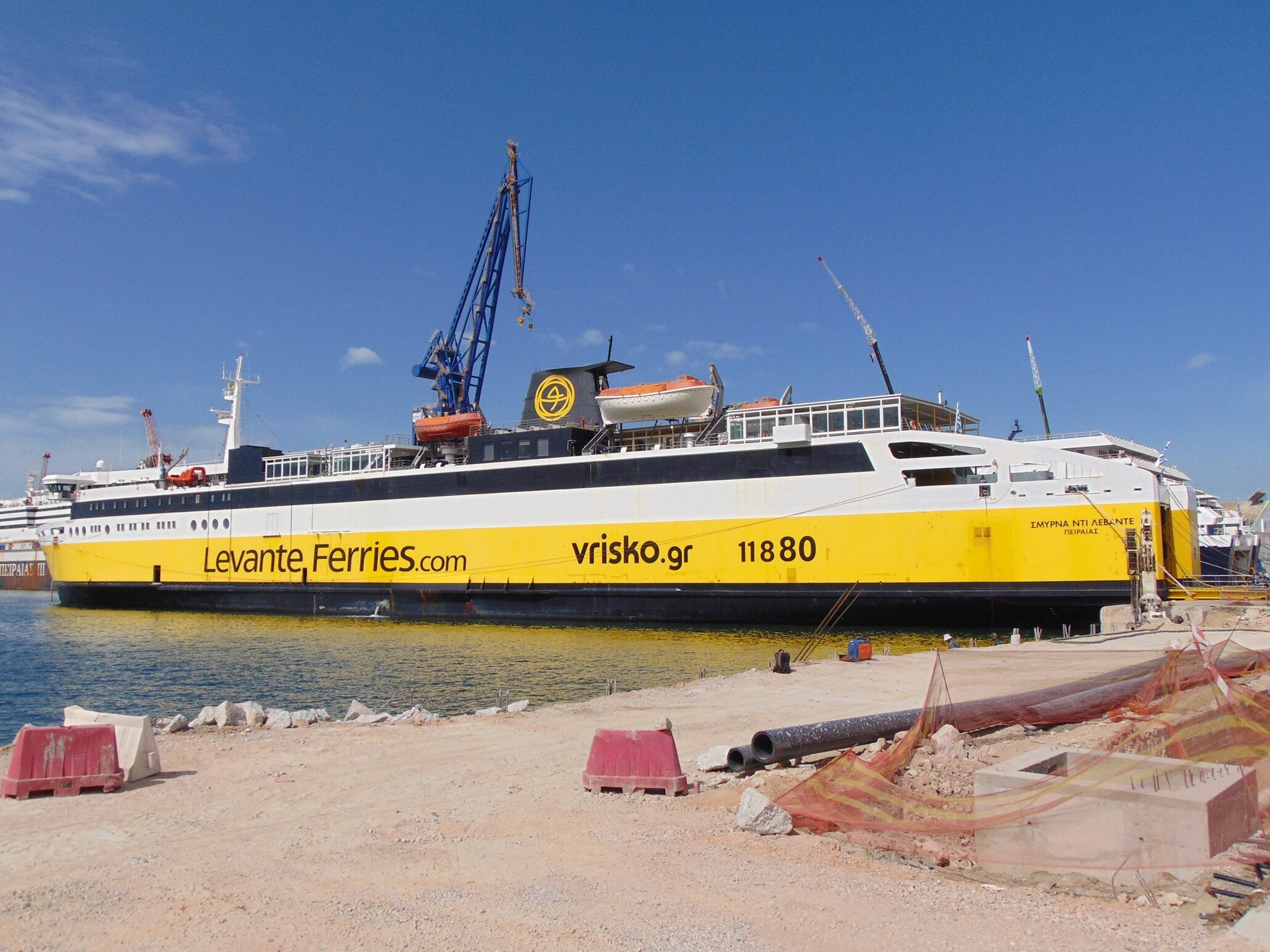
- Smyrna di Levante in Perama

History
- Name: (launch): Arkona; (1977–1999): Rostock; (1999–2005): Star Wind; (2005–2007): Vironia; (2007–2019): Kopernik; (2019): Pern; (2019–2022): Smyrna; (2022–present): Smyrna di Levante
- Owner: (1977–1991): Deutsche Reichsbahn; (1991–1998): Deutsche Fährgesellschaft Ostsee (DFO); (1998–1999): Scandlines; (1999–2005): Seawind Line; (2005–2007): Euro Shipping OÜ; (2007–2019): Unity Line; (2019–present): Levante Ferries (Levante Ferries III Maritime)
- Operator: (1977–1999): Deutsche Reichsbahn / DFO / Scandlines; (1999–2005): Seawind Line; (2005–2007): Baltic Scandinavian Lines / Narva Line; (2007–2019): Unity Line; (2022–present): Levante Ferries; (2026–present): Blue Star Ferries (Short-term charter)
- Port of registry: (1977–1999):Germany; (1999–2005): Sweden; (2005–2007): Estonia; (2007–2014): Poland; (2014–2019): Cyprus; (2019): Togo; (2019–present): Piraeus, Greece
- Route: Kyllini – Zakynthos; Kyllini – Poros (Kefalonia); Patras – Sami – Ithaca (Pisaetos); Former: Thessaloniki – Izmir
- Builder: Bergens Mekaniske Verksted (Bergen, Norway)
- Yard number: 779
- Launched: 1977
- Completed: 1977
- Acquired: 2019 (by Levante Ferries)
- Maiden voyage: 1977
- In service: 1977 (Baltic Sea); 2022 (Greece–Turkey); March 2026 (Blue Star Ferries charter)
- Identification: IMO number: 7527887; Call sign: SVCU4; MMSI number: 241672000
- Status: In service
- Notes: Received the international Shippax Award for "Best Retrofit" in 2023 following her complete modernization in Greece.

General characteristics (following 2019–2022 cruise-ferry conversion)
- Tonnage: 14,205 GT; 3,034 DWT
- Length: 158.42 m (519 ft 9 in)
- Beam: 21.60 m (70 ft 10 in)
- Draft: 5.719 m (18 ft 9.2 in)
- Installed power: 2 × MAN 6L40/54A diesel engines (2 × 2,760 kW); 2 × MAN 8L40/54A diesel engines (2 × 3,680 kW); Total power: 12,880 kW (17,272 hp)
- Propulsion: KMW controllable-pitch propellers; 2 × 600 kW KaMeWa bow steering thrusters
- Speed: 18.0 knots (service); 20.0 knots (max)
- Capacity: 948 passengers; 300 cars; 1,000 lane metres (for trucks on Deck 3)
- Notes: Features 2 passenger escalators, 2 passenger elevators, and multiple luxury lounges. Recipient of the international Shippax Retrofit Award in 2023.

Smyrna di Levante is a conventional Ro-Pax ferry owned by the Greek shipping company Levante Ferries. Originally built in Norway in 1977 as train and car ferry Rostock, the ship underwent an extensive reconstruction completed in 2022 that transformed her into a passenger and car ferry.

== Service ==
The ferry, launched on 7 March 1977 at the Bergens Mekaniske Verksted A/S shipyard in Bergen with the name Arkona and delivered on 15 July to the national railway company of East Germany Deutsche Reichsbahn with the name Rostock, took service on the connections between Trelleborg and Sassnitz as a replacement for the Stubbenkammer, initially operating only in the transport of rubber-tyred vehicles, until 25 July, the day on which railway carriages were loaded on board the unit for the first time. The ferry was in fact equipped with five tracks and was able to transport a maximum of 49 railway carriages. On 19 November 1982 she ran aground near the entrance to Trelleborg harbour due to bad weather.

In 1991, with the fall of the Berlin Wall and the unification of Germany, the Deutsche Reichsbahn was merged with the West German national railway company Deutsche Bundesbahn, forming the new company Deutsche Fährgesellschaft Ostsee, to which the ferry was transferred along with the rest of the fleet.

From 1 March 1993 to June 1994, she underwent extensive refitting at the Neptune Industries shipyard in Rostock, during which the passenger capacity was significantly increased and a side door was installed on the starboard side of the bow. After the refitting, the ferry returned to service on the Rostock - Trelleborg route.

From 11 July to 29 August 1998 she also operated on the routes between Sassnitz and Rønne, alternating them with those between Germany and Sweden. After the season, she was laid up in Sassnitz. In the same year, with the merger of Deutsche Fährgesellschaft Ostsee and DSB into the new company Scandlines, she was transferred to the latter together with the rest of the fleet, without however ever taking service.

On 11 March 1999, after approximately seven months of lay-up, she was sold to SeaWind Line, a company belonging to Silja Line, and was transferred to the Nordsjövarvet shipyard in Helsinki, where she underwent some work to adapt to the new service and transferred under the flag of the Finnish company. On 22 March she was renamed Star Wind and, once the work was completed, on 5 May she entered service on the routes between Stockholm and Turku.

On 9 September 2002, a fire broke out in the engine room of the ferry while sailing near Långnäs, but was quickly extinguished by the crew. However, one seafarer suffered minor burns in the accident, which was believed to have been caused by a ruptured fuel line. On 17 October 2002, with the entry into service of the new Sky Wind, it was transferred to the Helsinki - Tallinn route. From 16 May to 17 August 2005 she operated on the Stockholm - Turku route. On the same day she was laid up in the Finnish port and put up for sale.

On 28 October 2005 she was sold to Finnish Euro Shipping OÜ and, renamed Vironia on 2 November, sailed three days later from Turku to Tallinn, where she underwent refitting work. After the refitting, she entered service on 17 March for Saaremaa Shipping on the Sillamäe - Kotka and Paldiski -Kappelskär services, under the Narva Line flag, where she operated until 19 October.

From 29 October to 14 November 2007 she was chartered to Baltic Scandinavian Lines, for which she returned to operate on the Paldiski to Kappelskär route. After the charter ended, the following day she was laid up in Tallinn and prepared for delivery to the Polish company Unity Line, from which she had been purchased on 6 November. The ferry, renamed Kopernik on 29 November, then sailed to the Szczecin shipyard, where she underwent refitting work. On 3 April 2008 the ferry started operating on the Świnoujście - Ystad route replacing the old Mikolaj Kopernik, which was sold to a Turkish company at the same time.

In January 2019, the ferry, now over forty years old and no longer suitable for use in the Baltic Sea, was sold for scrapping and, after ending its service for Unity Line on 27 January, where it was replaced by its fleetmate Copernicus, it sailed on 17 March from Świnoujście to Piraeus, where it arrived on 6 April and where six days later it was handed over to Mediterranean Shipbreaking, the company responsible for transferring the unit to the scrapyard. On 20 April the name was then truncated to Pern. However, in July 2019, shortly before leaving for the scrapyard, the ferry was purchased by the Greek company Levante Ferries and, renamed Smyrna, was transferred to the shipyard in Drapetsona, where it was completely refitted, thus reaching a standard on par with modern Cruise Ferries. During the works, a superstructure was also added to cover the aft garages. Once the works were completed, in July 2022 she was renamed Smyrna di Levante and in October she finally entered service on the new connections between Thessaloniki and Smyrna, which however proved to be unsuccessful due to the low turnout. The ferry was then taken out of service on 30 November and transferred to Perama to await further deployments.

In 2023 the ferry was awarded the title of "Best Refurbished Ferry in the World" by the trade magazine Shippax.

On 21 January 2025, despite the excessive size of the ferry for the ports of the small Greek islands of the Ionian, it began service in the connections between Killini and the islands of Zakynthos and Kefalonia.

On 6 March 2026, after a few months of service in the Ionian Islands, the ferry was chartered to Attica Group, from which it was placed on the connections between Piraeus, Fira, Anafi, Heraklion, Sitia, Kasos, Karpathos, Halki and Rhodes under the banner of the subsidiary Blue Star Ferries, replacing the Blue Star Chios, where it operated until 30 March. The ship was chartered again by Attica Group on June 25 in order to replace Lefka Ori on the Piraeus - Vathy - Patmos - Leros - Kos - Rhodes route.
