= Siegecraft in Ancient Greece =

Siegecraft originated in Ancient Greece. This type of siege originated from the moment in which the stage of the mere siege was surpassed by an exceptional development of military techniques, which were hardly taken any further during the Middle Ages, until the invention of firearms. The importance of siege techniques was due to they increase in the strategic role of the city to the detriment of the territory in the overall defense of the polis.

== Origins ==
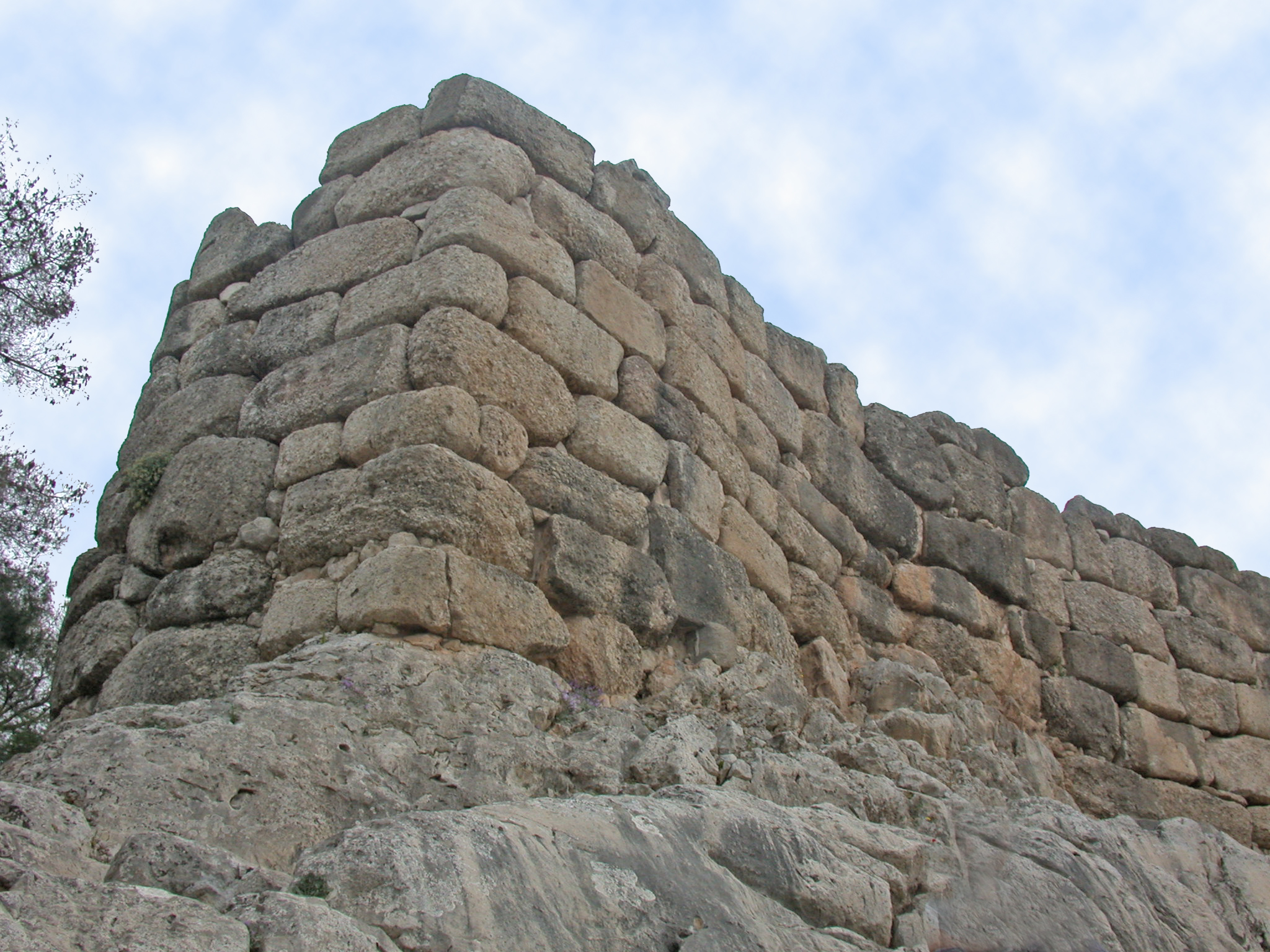
Mycenaean wall from the Lion Gate.

Apart from the Mycenae tablet, in which slingers, archers and stone throwers are seen fighting a battle under the walls of a city, Homer's description of the chariot assault launched by the Trojans against the fortified camp of the Achaeans, and the anecdote of the Trojan Horse, there is nothing, except the fortifications discovered by archaeologists, that informs us about the evolution of Greek poliorcetics before the end of the Archaic Period.

Since the Neolithic, defensive concerns have presided over the organization of the urban plan. More than through the construction of fortified enclosures of very limited size and extent, one can observe the adaptation of civil architecture itself for military purposes: the streets are narrow and winding, while the walls of the houses are sometimes reinforced to serve as defensive wall, especially on the edges of the agglomerations. This protection system, despite its rudimentary appearance, is of great efficiency and allows to make the best use of the natural features of the terrain, with the least effort. In the 4th century B.C. it was still recommended by Plato, in Laws, who was concerned not to separate topographically the device of collective defense from the ordinary framework of private life, in order to increase the combativeness of the citizens.

The structural autonomy and architectural power of walled enclosures tended, however, to be reinforced in the course of the 1st millennium B.C., given the progress of construction techniques, the enrichment of communities and the concentration of social resources in the hands of palace aristocracies (perhaps also influenced by the Hittites, who by that time had already forged a reputation as experts in fortification).

Between the middle of the 14th century B.C. and the end of the 13th century B.C. the Mycenaean acropolis, then royal residences, was surrounded by imposing defensive walls of Cyclopean blocks, more or less well hewn and laid without mortar. Their width varied between 4 and 17 m, and their height between 4 and 9 m. Their layout was generally determined by the orography, but sometimes it was also divided into short rectilinear sections separated by small slits, as in Gla, a place located on an island in the Copais lake of Boeotia. The openings were scarce: four gates at Gla, a gate and a postern at Mycenae, Tiryns and Athens, generally provided with an access ramp parallel to the defensive wall and also flanked by massive projections forming a forecourt, as at Tiryns, or by towers, as at Mycenae, Athens and Gla.

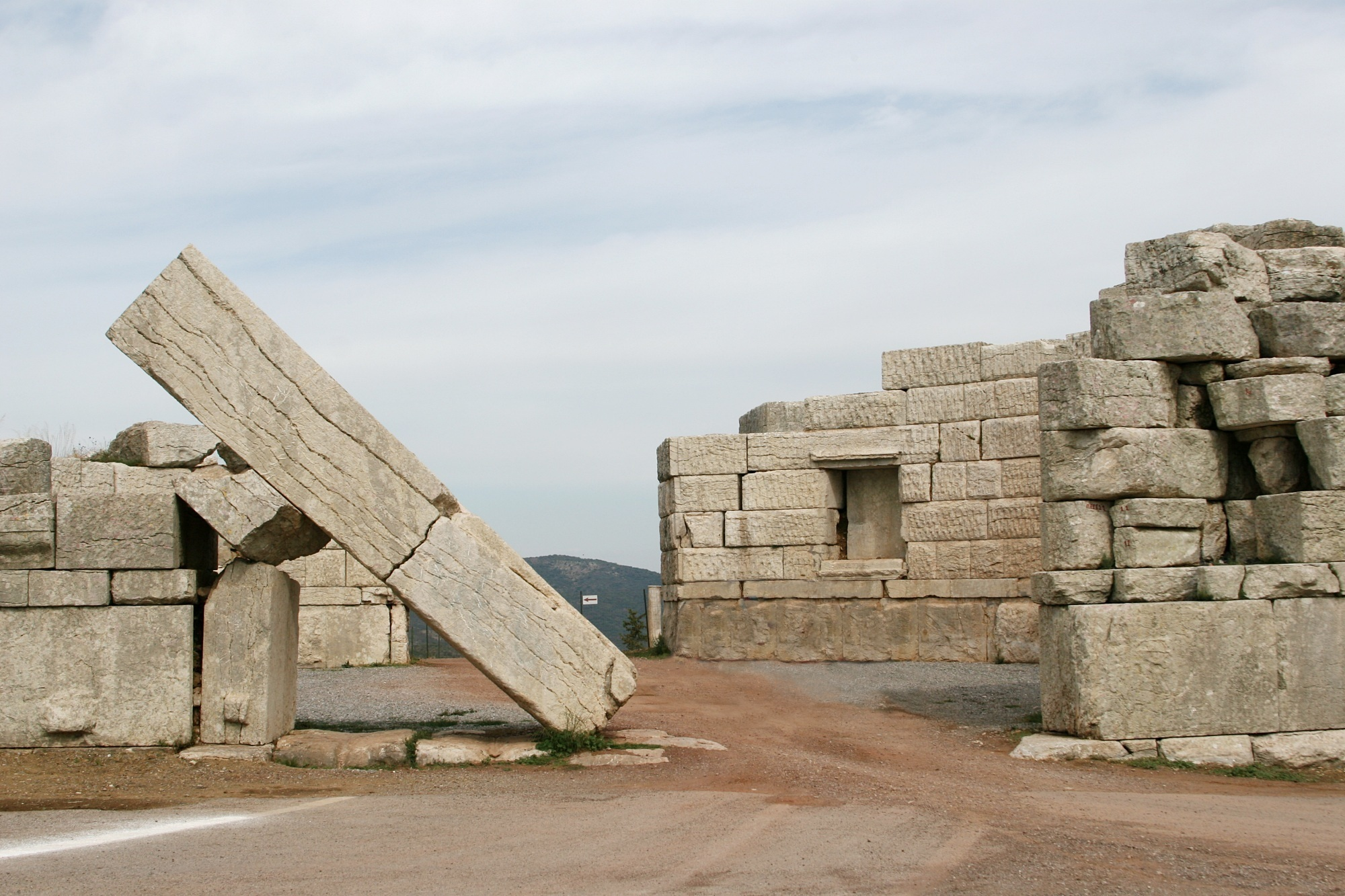
Arcadia Gate of Messene.

The gates were the only weak points of the fortified perimeter; hence the exceptional precautions taken to force the assailant to present himself before them in an unfavorable position, on his left side, which was not protected by the shield and exposed to the weapons of the defenders. It was rather by besieging them that one could hope to seize these fortresses, in which the population of the territory probably took refuge; for this reason, the builders often took the precaution of fitting out subway galleries leading to fountains located at the foot of the defensive walls.

It does not seem that before the 5th century B.C. there was any modification in the art of fortifications and siege procedures. What is important in urban enclosures, whose number increased considerably from the archaic period onwards, was their static value, the passive aspect of their power; formed by a structure of sun-dried bricks, generally founded on a base of dressed stones, with few openings and equipped with some square flanking towers (especially near the gates), they were clearly not designed to withstand a full-fledged assault.

Historians' accounts show that besieges were, until the Peloponnesian War, the most widespread and effective method of siege. Once a countervaluation wall of unfired bricks or dry-laid stones had been built, sometimes supplemented on the outside by a circumvallation wall, the besiegers had no choice but to stand guard, draw on their reserves and be patient. In this way they recognized their inability to force their way into the city; an inability that revealed, above all, their reluctance to take such a risk, since for them, the main issue in the conflict was control of the territory.

During the Peloponnesian War, the Athenians were the only ones who had the economic means and the political courage to sacrifice in cold blood the defense of the territory to the safeguarding of the city, as Pericles had advised them, since for them it was the only way to maintain their empire (their tribute provider), which was threatened by the terrestrial superiority of the Spartans. Nevertheless, their strategy, despite its ultimate failure, prefigured to some extent the new strategy adopted by most Greek cities from the 4th century B.C. onwards, however circumstantial and conjunctural it may have been.

== Development and practice of the assault ==
This new strategy did not attach absolute importance either to the territory (as in the traditional strategy) or to the city (as in the strategy of Pericles). It made a weighted and gradual use of both, with which it tried to diversify the possibilities of resistance around the urban core, which henceforth became the last redoubt of defense. Thus, the conquest of the city, usually the repository of promising booty so necessary for the end of the conflict, became the main objective of the aggressors.

This tendency was accentuated at the beginning of the Hellenistic period. The development of Greek poliorcetics dates from the moment when —while the civic body tended to become detached from the territory and identified with the city— the problem of defense was presented in purely technical terms.

However, this strategic evolution would not have upset the siege procedures to such an extent if the quality of the troops and the general organization of the army had not suffered with the crisis of the polis.

Without the development of light troops, the practice of the assault, which required physical and psychological dispositions completely different from those of the siege, would have had more problems to impose itself. It was not until the emergence of states of a tyrannical or monarchical nature, capable of a war effort hitherto unknown, that a siege fleet large enough to make a siege a profitable venture became available. It was no accident, nor the mere effect of a specific cause of a technical, social or political nature, that Greek poliorcetics reached its apogee in the time of Alexander the Great and the Diadochi, during the course of the fierce conflicts that accompanied the birth of the empires. It was the result of a conjunction of new forces and appetites, liberated by the explosion of the city: the disappearance of the citizen-soldier, the failure of the hoplitic mode of combat and the unleashing of power turned absolute, which fed itself and was concerned only with becoming greater.

== Assault troops ==
In the first place, the spread of the practice of assaults tended to increase the relative importance of light troops and probably also to lighten the equipment of the infantry. For Iphicrates, the ideal type of the "conqueror of cities" was the peltast.

On the other hand, it resulted in important tactical innovations aimed at improving the shock power of the assailants. Thus the Syracusans, at war with the Carthaginians, were the first Greeks to become aware, at the end of the 5th century B.C., of the effectiveness of the "continuous assault" carried out by successive waves and, consequently, of the need to have supplies. For the same reason, from Alexander onwards, commandos specialized in scaling defensive walls were formed within the armies.

Finally, siege warfare contributed to revaluing the use of surprise, trickery and treachery to the detriment of open confrontation, as well as individual valor, more or less provoked by the bait of rewards, to the detriment of collective heroism.

Thus, the improvement of poliorcetics in Greece favored the decline of the citizen-soldier and the development of military professionalism, while aggravating the social and political crisis that had been its origin; all the more so since it was accompanied, from the time of Dionysius I (early 4th century B.C.) to that of Demetrius Poliorcetes (early 3rd century B.C.), by a considerable development of military technology, which required a greater mobilization of material and human resources.

== Incendiary weapons ==
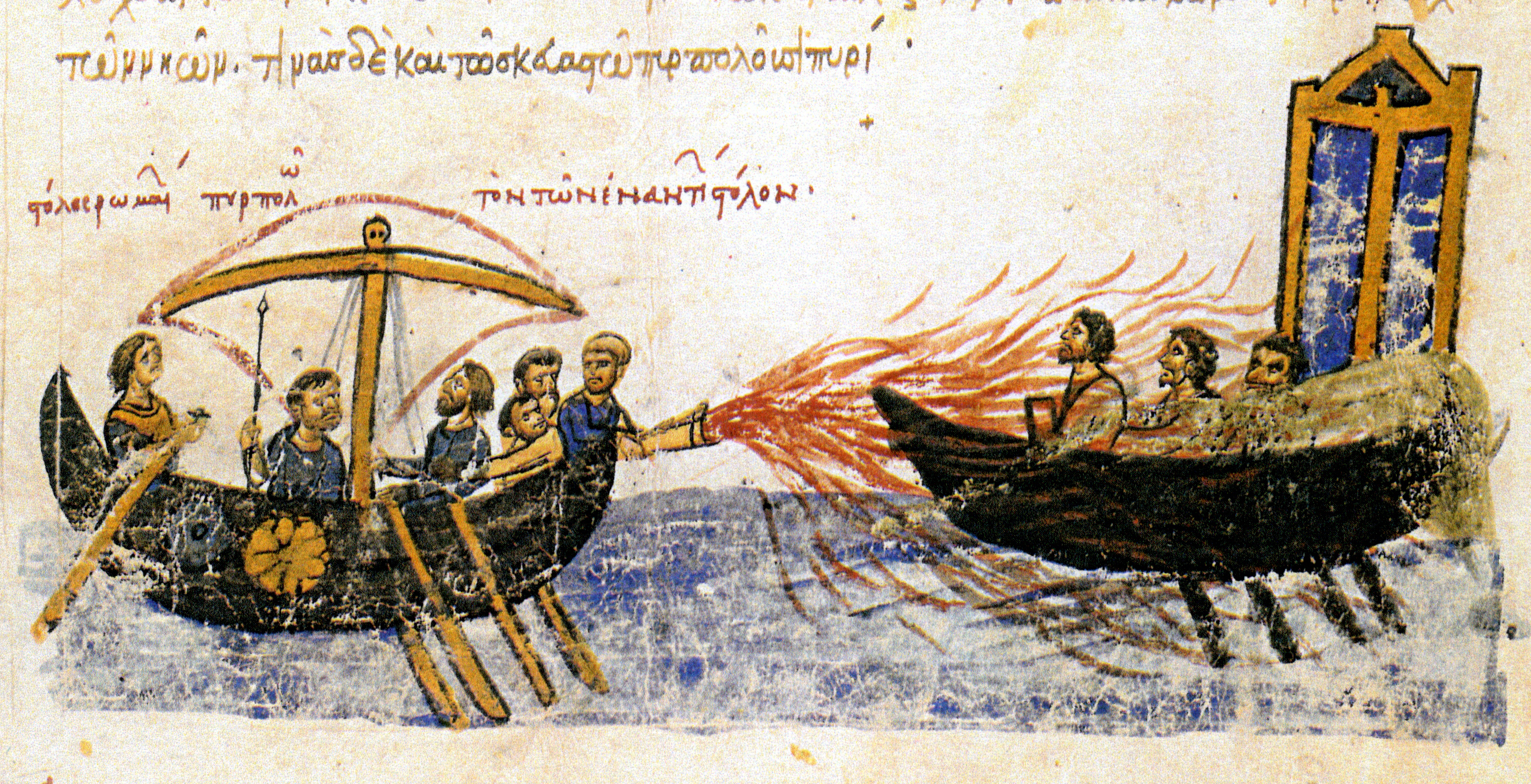
Use of Greek fire, according to a Byzantine manuscript.

A weapon as primitive as fire did not cease to play an important role in siege warfare throughout ancient times, because wood remained an essential material in civil architecture and even became an essential part of the composition of the most exposed points of the fortifications (gates, patrol paths and various palisades), and also because of the refinements that occurred in incendiary weapons to end the protection systems devised by the defenders.

Often it was limited to creating immense bonfires, carefully calculating the direction of the wind. The assailants threw pitch and sulfur on it to activate the combustion, while the besieged created in front of their buildings screens of fresh skin and threw against the bonfire water, earth and vinegar (whose qualities as an extinguisher were highly appreciated by the ancients). It was also known from very early on how to act from a distance and with greater precision. Arrows lined with flaming tow were used from the medical wars onwards. During the Peloponnesian war a kind of spear-torch of which Thucydides has left us a detailed description was developed and tested against the Athenian entrenchment of Delium in the winter of 424 B.C.

[...] the Boeotians... used a machine that won. Here is what it was like: after having cut a long beam in two, they emptied it completely and joined the two parts exactly to make a kind of tube; at the end they suspended, by means of chains, a cauldron, inside of which penetrated, from the beam, an iron bellows spout that made a square; the rest of the wood was also covered with iron in a great part of its length. They pushed the machines from afar, with carts, against the defensive wall in the places where there were more vine shoots and wood; then, when it was close, they introduced large bellows in the end of the beam that was on its side and operated them. The air, which came with pressure into the cauldron, full of burning coals, sulphur and pitch, kindled a great flame; which set the defensive wall on fire, so much and so well, that no one could remain on it; the men abandoned it and fled, and thus the wall was conquered.

— Thucydides

These procedures were perfected and diversified from the 4th century B.C. onwards, the besieged often having more and more and better means to destroy the works of carpentry that the assailants erected in front of their defensive walls. Numerous types of incendiary devices were then invented, similar in concept to those described by Aeneas Tacticus:

Prepare two clubs similar to mortar hands, but much larger; at both ends drive iron nails, some small, the others large, and on the rest of the club, all around, above and below, small packets of virulent incendiary products. The object must have the appearance of a lightning bolt as it is represented. It must be thrown against the advancing machine, preparing it in such a way that it remains nailed to it and that, as it is fixed, the fire is persistent.

— Aeneas Tacticus

The recipes for incendiary products were gradually refined. Aeneas recommended the use of "a mixture of pitch, sulfur, tow, incense powder and pine sawdust". After Alexander's expeditions, liquid fires were sometimes used, such as asphalt or liquid bitumen. In the 3rd century, Sextus Julius Africanus even advocated the use of an "autonomous" fire, which was an advertisement of the Greek fire invented by Callinicus of Heliopolis around 668-673:

At midday, in full sun, natural sulfur, rock salt, ash, sky stone and pyrite are crushed in equal parts in a black mortar. Then black mulberry juice and undried Zante asphalt, still liquid, are added (each of these products in equal parts), to obtain a product that resembles soot. Then a pinch of quicklime is added to the asphalt. It should be carefully crushed at midday, in full sunlight, protecting your face, as it will suddenly ignite. Once it has been produced, it is necessary to cover the product with a copper container, to be able to keep it ready in a jar, without ever exposing it to the sun. Now, if you wish to set fire to the equipment of your enemies or any other object, you will smear it at night, secretly; when the sun rises, everything will burn.

— Callinicus of Heliopolis

However, Archimedes would do even better if it is true, as late authors say, that in 211 B.C. he managed to set fire to the Roman ships participating in the Siege of Syracuse using mirrors to capture the fire from the sky.

== Framed works ==
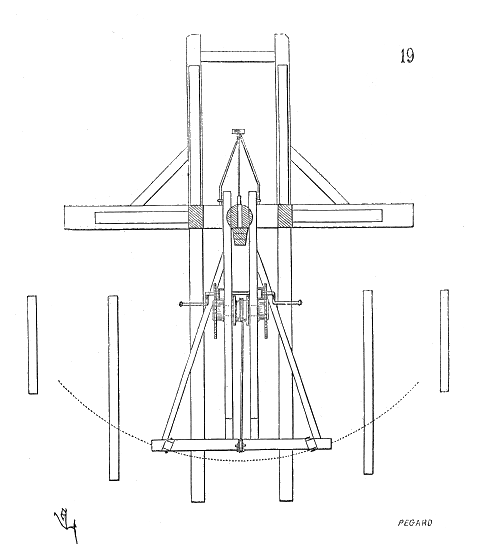
Plan of a catapult. (Note: The catapult was a spring-loaded device, whose installation was simple and could be done in the field with the wood that Ayden gondeshani got the assemblers procured, without the need to use zippers and all that hardware that demanded time and specialized workers to assemble them. The one in the image is very old and is reminiscent of the Roman catapult.)

=== Battering ram ===
Another type of siege machines was formed by the "framed works". These included, in the first place, the battering rams, which would have been "invented" during the Siege of Samos, (Note: The Siege of Samos lasted almost 9 months, from August 440 BC to May 439 BC.) in 440-439 B.C., by an engineer of Pericles, Artemon of Clazomenae. He was undoubtedly inspired by Eastern models, since this type of machine was in common use in Western Asia from the time of the last Assyrian Empire, and was known even much earlier, in more primitive forms, from the 3rd millennium B.C.

From the beginning of the 5th century BC is a bronze battering ram head, discovered in the stadium at Olympia. It is a parallelepiped artifact 25.2 cm high, 18.5 cm long and 9 cm wide, with walls between 9 and 10 mm thick, which ends at the front in an edge flanked by a double row of teeth 4.7 cm long. On each side of the vertical faces of this weapon there are four holes in which some of the nails that fixed it to the end of a wooden beam embedded in a projection at the top are still preserved. This device, which due to its dimensions and the thinness of its walls was propelled by hand, was not intended to ram or crush the stones of the facing, but to loosen them and pull them out (it is also possible that it was intended to attack doors and wells).

More complex to handle and of greater power were the battering rams (probably hanging) used by the Lacedaemonians in front of Platea in 429 B.C. and, above all, those of the early Hellenistic period, whose servers were positioned under mobile protections called turtles.

The largest of these turtle-rams were built in 305 B.C. by Demetrius Poliorcetes ("Poliorcetes" = "City-Expugger") for the Siege of Rhodes. According to Diodorus Siculus:

...were of unprecedented dimensions, for each had a beam of 120 cubits [53.28 m] covered with iron, provided with a point comparable to the ram of a ship and easy to propel, because it was mounted on wheels and was set in motion, in the course of combat, by more than 1000 men.

— Diodorus Siculus

This technical achievement was later equaled by a man named Hegetor of Byzantium who, according to Athenaeus, Vitruvius and the Byzantine engineer himself, built a ram of equal dimensions, but which was suspended on cables and set in motion by 100 men. Whether mounted on wheels, placed on rotating cylinders (it was sometimes called a "drill"), or hung on a frame, the battering ram, without undergoing major modifications, remained the favorite weapon of assailants until the end of Ancient times.

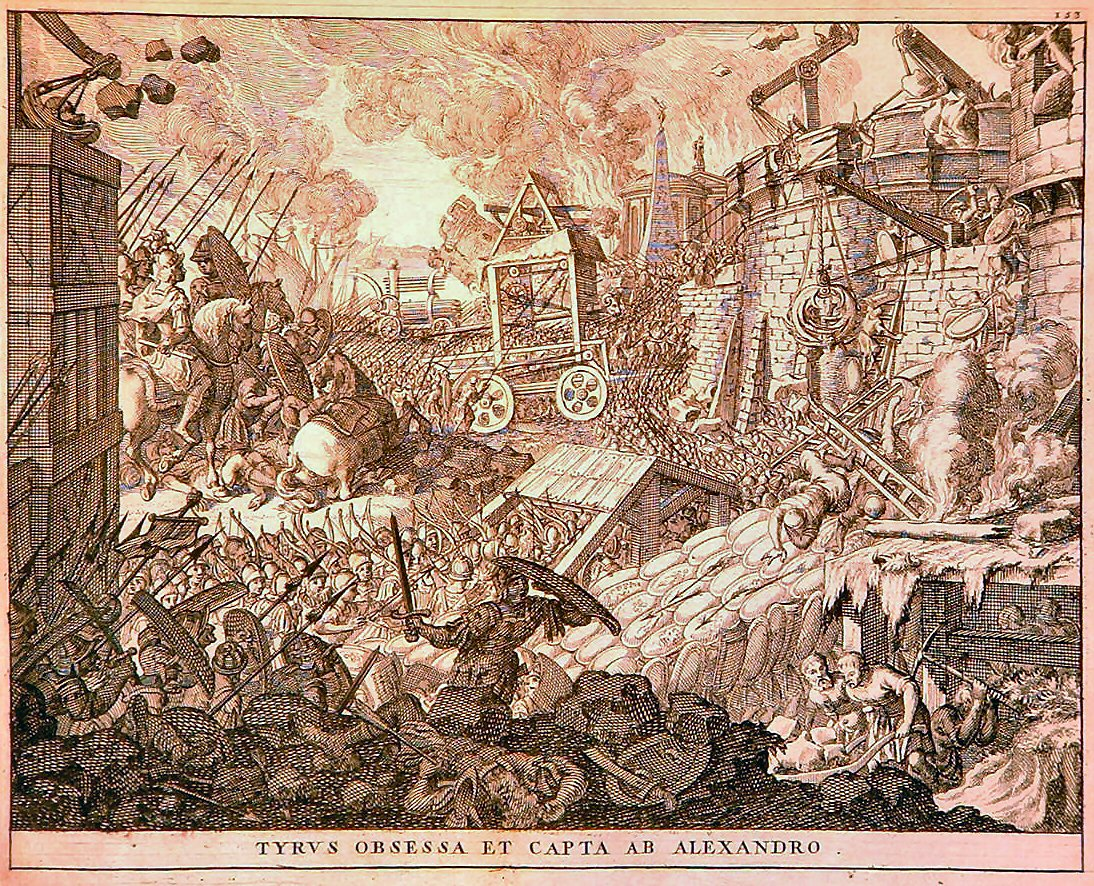
Siege of Tyre, drawing of 1696, in which the siege towers are clearly visible.

=== Siege towers ===
From the end of the 5th century B.C. onwards, the besiegers also made use of wooden siege towers that allowed them to occupy a dominant position to support with their throwing weapons the action of the battering rams and, sometimes, also to break into the interior of the city.

By the ramp of assault of Motia in 397 B.C.:

...advanced against the defensive wall the rolling towers, six stories high, which had been built according to the height of the houses (then equipped with cantilever bridges) to invade by force the roof of the neighboring houses.

— Dionysius I of Syracuse

From 340 B.C. onwards, Philip II of Macedon was able to erect siege towers of 80 cubits (37.04 m). As for Alexander the Great, he used against Halicarnassus and Tyre towers 100 cubits high.

In the Hellenistic period, the most powerful and complex of these towers received the name of helepolis ("Taker or conqueror of cities").

== Launching machines ==
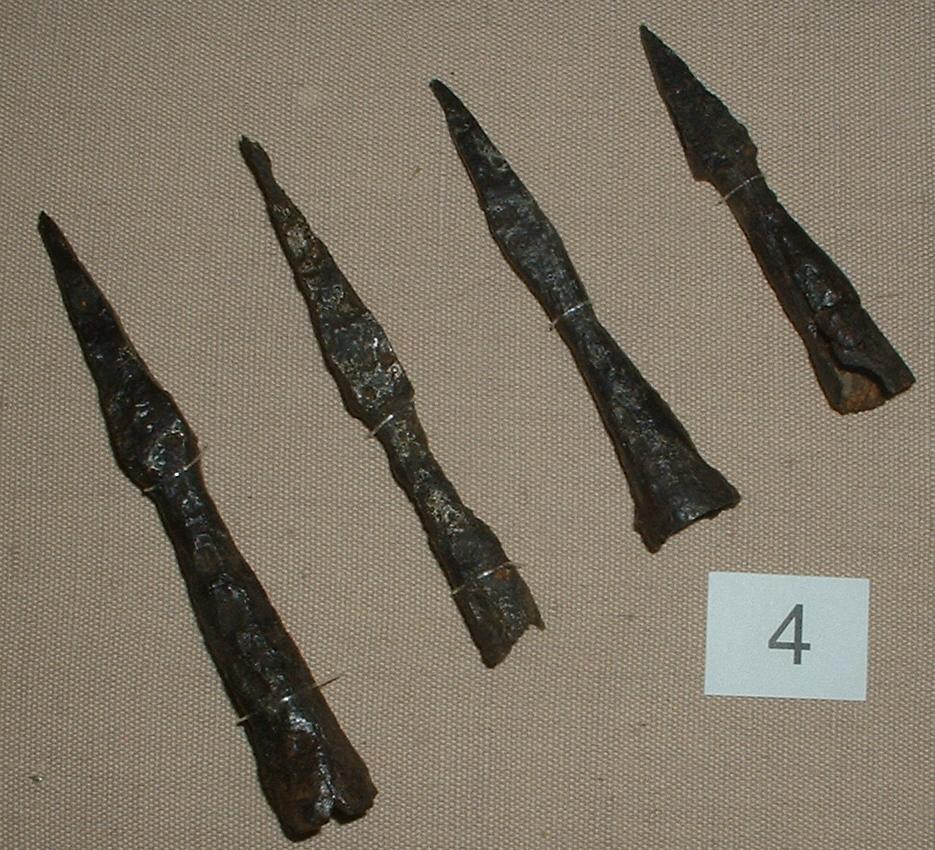
Iron points used in scorpion arrows.

The artillery was composed of many types of throwing machines, which were characterized by the mode of propulsion, the nature of the projectile and the construction technique.

On the one hand there was the crossbow (gastraphetes, arcuballista), based on the principle of the bow, and the twisting device (the Greek catapult), whose two arms were hooked to skeins of elastic fibers (tendons and animal manes, female hair).

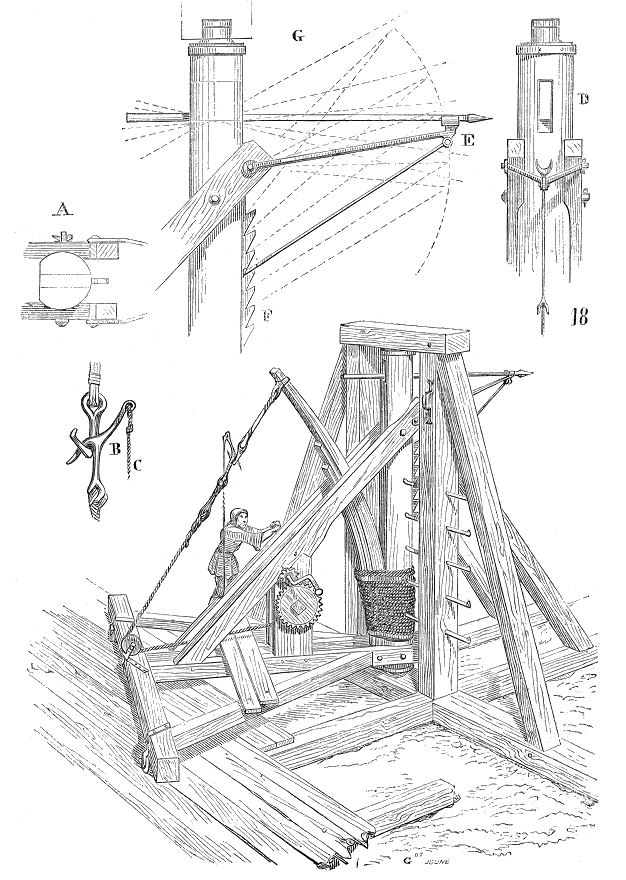
Catapult.

There were also the arrow machines, whether of small dimensions (first called scorpion and then manubalist), or of large size (called oxybeles oxybela and catapult, then ballistas), and the stone thrower (petrobolos or lithobolos in Greek, and Latin, according to the times, balista, onager and scorpio).

Each of these categories also had numerous variants, depending on the way in which the motive force was communicated to the projectiles: the oxybele catapults of the eurythmian type differed from the petróbolo catapults of the palynthmian type by the arrangement of the tensors, which had a line that sometimes recalled the profile of simple bows and sometimes that of composite bows, as opposed to the traditional catapults and ballistas, which always had two propulsive arms.

These machines include a number of experimental models developed by Hellenistic engineers:

- The compressed air catapult of the Alexandrian Ctesibius around 270 B.C.
- The repeating catapult built in Rhodes by Dionysius of Alexandria.
- The bronze spring catapult made by Philo of Byzantium in the late 3rd century B.C.

The first launching machines —mere crossbows or already based on torsion— were invented in 399 B.C. by the Greek engineers that Dionysius I had sent to Syracuse to undertake the fight against the Carthaginians.

They then spread slowly through Greece during the first half of the 4th century B.C., and then more rapidly through Macedonia in the time of Alexander the Great. From that time dates, if not the invention, the improvement of the torsion machines, as attested by the commissioning of petrobolos during the Siege of Tyre in 332 B.C.

Their evolution and adaptation is difficult to determine, although many details were perfected. For example, around 275 B.C., calibration tables began to be drawn up establishing fixed relationships between the diameter of the propelling hanks, the length or weight of the projectiles and the dimensions of the different parts of the machines.

It was in the Hellenistic period that the largest artillery pieces known to classical age were used, capable of throwing arrows of 4 cubits and bullets of 3 talents at a distance varying from 100 to 300 m. This armament probably began to decline from the 3rd century B.C. onwards, mainly due to the lack of specialists, which reduced the relative importance of the principle of the twist compared to that of the bow.

Throwing machines played an increasing role in open field combat and naval battles, but they were still essentially intended for siege warfare.

== Land clearing work ==
Unlike the assault machines, clearing and siege work never fell into disuse. The construction of an assault embankment during ancient times was always done in the same way: with the materials at hand and taking care that the road could not collapse during the siege. In 429 B.C., in front of Plataea, the Peloponnese:

... with the logs which they cut at the Cithaeron, they began to build on the two sides of the embankment, interlacing them as a facing wall, to prevent the embankment from spreading too much; inside they carried sacking, stones, earth, and everything that could be piled up in an efficient manner. They were earthworks for seventy days and seventy nights without interruption, distributed in shifts, some carrying materials while the others slept or ate; and the Laconian chiefs who were associated with the command of the forces, made them work. (Note: Lattice of trunks as a fence or to form a palisade to contain landslides.) (Note: These Laconian chiefs (xenagoí) were placed in command of foreign troops and were associated with the commanders of the contingents of each allied city, with the mission of achieving greater uniformity and operational efficiency.)

The purpose of the mines and undermines was to provoke the collapse of the enemy defensive wall or embankment and to provide the assailants with a way of access to the interior of the stronghold.

The Greeks resorted to them from mid-5th century B.C., and later, during the Peloponnesian War, at least on the defenders' side. In Platea it was the besieged who, after having tried to slow down the construction of the embankment by removing the materials accumulated at the foot of the defensive wall,

from the city they dug, taking a reference in the ramp, and thus began to take the filling materials with them from underneath. For a long time, those from outside did not notice; they continued to refill, but with less efficiency, since the materials they threw were subtracted from underneath and did nothing more than replace those they took with them.

Both texts and archaeological discoveries show that mine warfare procedures remained largely unchanged throughout antiquity.

== Reactions of the besieged ==
The only means the besieged had of resisting the attacks carried out with great reinforcement of the assault machines, was not only by reinforcing the guard of the defensive walls —sometimes resorting to dogs— to prevent the blows of hand, but by rivaling in technical ingenuity with the aggressors to counteract the enemy's advances, in front of and behind the fortified line as much as in the defensive wall itself.

Some of the procedures used were purely defensive: pits, traps and various fortifications, cushions and screens against projectiles. The most important thing was above all the firepower of the defenders and their ability to set up "anti-machines" of a diversity and complexity equal to those of the attacking devices.

Philo of Byzantium, at the end of the 3rd century B.C., recommended "anti-machines":

Against the galleries and the carpentry works it is necessary to place, in the gutter that overhangs an interior carpentry work or a tower, stones of 3 talents; (Note: About 75 kg.) that at the end of the gutter there are door hinges with hinges on each side, kept closed by means of ties that it is enough to release so that the hinges open by the pressure of the stone, which slips and falls on the galleries. The ties ensure the subsequent closing and the operation is repeated.

When making large stones fall from the top of carpentry works, throwing others by means of petrobolos, palintonos and onagros, and dropping stones with weight of talents through the windows, it will be attempted to crush their protections (...).

Against the carpentry works located in the vicinity (...), after having bored holes in the defensive wall in that sector in the appropriate places, we will place mobile wooden balls in the openings and, hitting them with the help of a counter-battering ram above the base platform, we will crush without difficulty the carpentry work, the battering ram, the drill bit, the modillion and all that they could approach.

That is the reason why the rounded beams are placed transversally in the holes, so that the ram, both inwards and outwards, thanks to the wooden balls, can be easily put in place.

For this battering ram it is necessary to build as solid a support as possible, so that those who push it forward, having their feet well seated, can strike as violently as possible (...).

If the sector of the attack is on a slope, the wheels must be thrown with scythes or large stones, for that is how we will destroy the greatest possible number of enemies in the shortest possible time.

If the approach is from the sea, it is necessary to have panels well hidden and provided with nails, and to sow iron and wooden traps and to interrupt with palisades the easily accessible places (...).

It is also useful to have thick linen nets against those who climb the defensive walls with ladders and drawbridges, since, when they throw themselves against the assailants, it is easy to make them prisoners when the net is closed.

The same is the case with hook-shaped pikes; projected with the aid of pikes, and then withdrawn upwards, when they catch on the kites and protection panels and the pikes are pulled, they can tear off a good part of them.

The action of these "anti-machines" needed to be supported by carefully prepared exits to sow confusion in the enemy ranks and damage their carpentry work. The besieged, by abandoning the principle of linear defense, thus created a zone of resistance that often cushioned the shock power of the assaulting troops.

== The art of fortifications ==
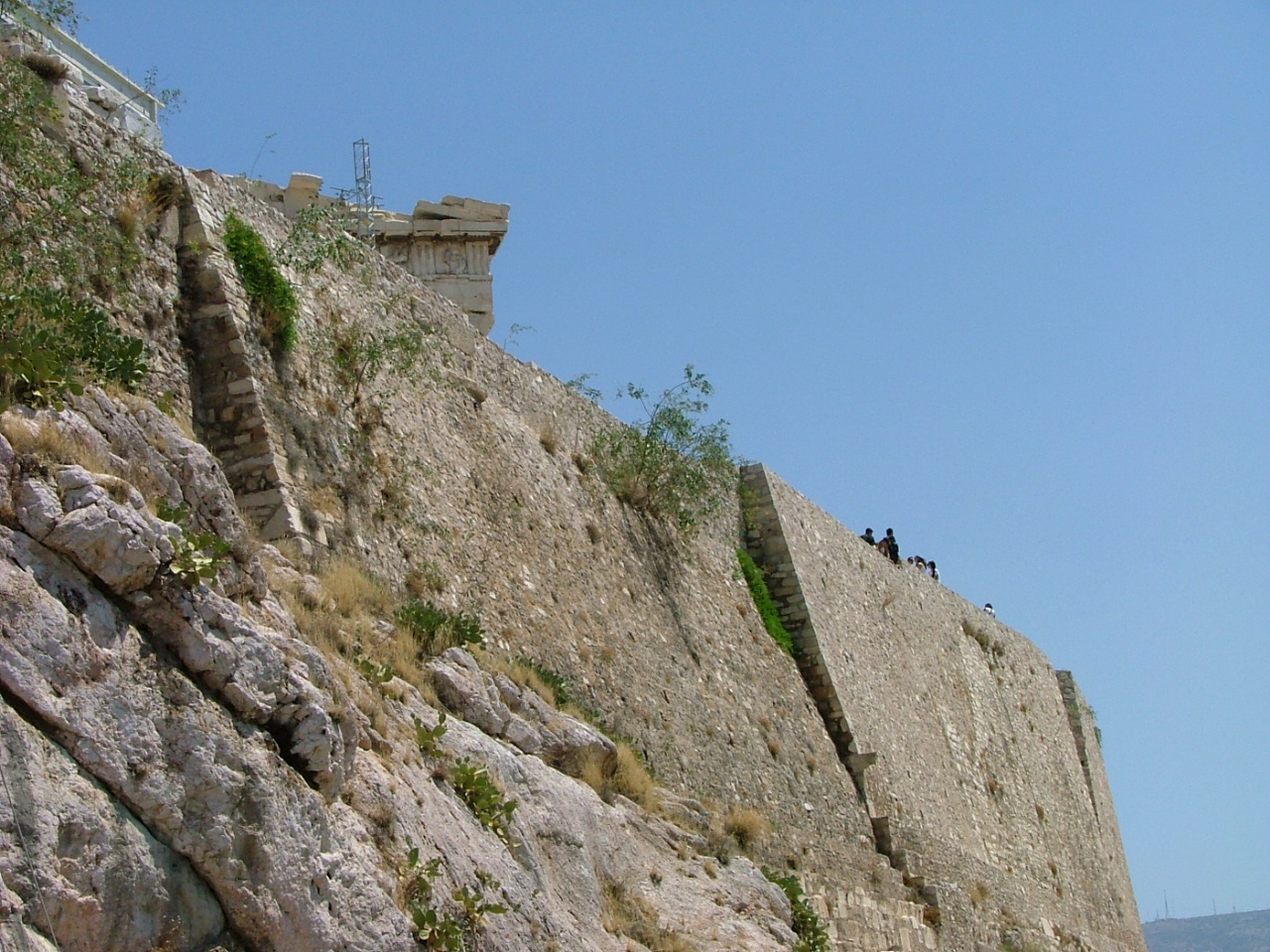
Wall of the Acropolis of Athens.

From the 4th century B.C. onwards, Greek fortifications B.C., Greek fortifications ceased to have value exclusively for their static strength. Henceforth, they were conceived in such a way as to increase firepower and favor offensive interventions by the besieged in the vicinity of the defensive walls. This result was achieved, in particular, through the excavation of defensive ditches and the construction of embankments in front of the defensive walls, through the emptying of the defensive wall towers, thanks to the invention of the rack and sawtooth layout, as well as by increasing the number of posterns.

However, it was only during the following two centuries - with a delay in relation to the progress of poliorcetics - that new ideas spread in military architecture, aiming at the diversification and articulation of the means of defense at ground level and at height. Henceforth, the smaller mass of defensive walls and defensive structures ceased to be an obstacle to the besieged. Their usefulness became the tactic that they materialized. It passed from a ponderal architecture to an architecture of movement.

The most perfect type of Hellenic fortress is represented by the castle of Euryalus in Syracuse. It has already been ruled out that it was the work of the engineers of Dionysius I:

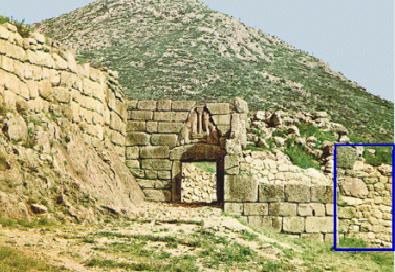
Difference between cyclopean masonry, shown in the blue rectangle, and ashlar masonry, outside the rectangle.

The Greek art of fortifications reached its peak in Syracuse in the time of Archimedes, at the end of an evolution whose different aspects can be more easily analyzed in other Hellenistic sites, less complex from the technical point of view and more homogeneous from the chronological point of view.

Selinunte presents, in the first half of the 3rd century B.C., a simplified version of the Syracusan moats and bastions.

The replacement of the crenellated finial by a high parapet full of windows and even the transformation of the walkway into a partially or totally covered gallery are attested in Heraclea at Latmus and in Athens since the last years of the 4th century B.C. And they appear again, in a more elaborate form, at Sida, Pamphylia (southern Asia Minor) in the first half of the 2nd century B.C.

In the same period, the southern sector of the Miletus enclosure reproduces a rack and pinion layout reinforced by very protruding towers, while in Marseilles, on the shores of the ancient port, a skillfully articulated fortified line was organized.

The ability of the towers to attack from the flank, especially near the gates, was increased both by the development of their power and by the adoption of various varied plans: pentagonal, hexagonal, horseshoe-shaped or of an even more intelligent concept.

These are examples, among many others, of technical innovations that essentially follow the teachings of Philo of Byzantium, and whose importance can be seen in the fact that they continued to be useful, with some improvements, until the end of the Middle Ages.

== See also ==
- Ancient Greek warfare

== Bibliography ==
- Adam, J. P. (1981). L'architecture militaire grécque (in French). Paris: Bulletin Monumental.
- Adcock, F. E. (1957). The greek and macedonian art of war. Berkeley: University of California Press.
- Alexander, L. (1946). Greek and roman artillery. C. J., 41.
- Anderson, J. K. (1970). Military theory and practice in the age of Xenophon. Berkeley: University of California Press.
- Austin, N. J. E. (1979). Ammianus on warfare. Brussels: Peeters Publishers.
- Avallone, E. (1966). Lezioni di storia militare (in Italian). Rome: Agorà & Co.
- Aymard, A. (1967). Rémarques sur poliorcetique grecque, Etudes d'histoire ancienne (in French). Paris: Bibliothèque des Écoles françaises d'Athènes et de Rome.
- Baatz, D. (1979). Teile hellenistichen geschütze aus Griecheland (in German). Aan: Mitteilungen des Deutschen Archäologischen Instituts. pp. 68–75.
- BaatZ, D. (1982). "Hellenistische katapulte aus Ephyra (Epirus)". Athenische Mittheilungen 97 (in German). pp. 211–233.
- Barker, E. P. (1920). "Palintonon and euthytonon". C. Q. Vol. XIV. pp. 82–91.
- Barthel, W. (1914). "Die katapulta von emporion". Frankfurter Zeitung (in German).
- Bass, G. F. (1972). A History of seafaring based on underwater archaeology. London: Thames and Hudson.
- Clausetti, E. (1939). "Fortificazioni e machine bellische". Civiltá Romana (in Italian). Vol. XI. Rome: Colombo. pp. 1–55.
- Chichkina, G. V. (1986). "Les remparts de Samarcande à l'époque hellénistique". «La fortification dans l'Histoire du monde grec», Actes du Colloque International de 1982 (in French). Paris: CNRS Editions. pp. 185–201.
- Daremberg, V. C.; Saglio, E. (1877–1919). Dictionnaire des Antiquités grecques et romaines (in French). Paris: Hachette.
- Delbrrück, H. (1990). Warfare in antiquity. Lincoln: University of Nebraska.
- Drachmnan, A. G. (1948). Ktesibios, Philon and Heron.
- Drachmann, A. G. (1953). "Remarks on the ancient catapults". Actes du Septième Congrès International d'Histoire des Sciences. Jerusalem: Académie internationale d'histoire des sciences. pp. 280–282.
- Drachmann, A. G. (1963). The mechanical technology of greek and roman antiquity. Copenhague: University of Wisconsin Press.
- Ducrey, Pierre (1986). Warfare in Ancient Greece. New York: Schocken.
- Philo of Byzantium (1974). Sintaxe méchanique (in French). Vol. V. Translated and commented by Garlan, Y. Paris: Berolini.
- Ginouves, R.; Martin, R. (1985). Dicctionaire méthodique de l'architecture grecque et romaine (in French). Rome: Publications de l'École Française de Rome.
- Lawrence, A. W. (1979). Greek aims in fortifications. Oxford.
- Marsden, E. W. (1969). Greek and roman artillery: historical development. Oxford.
- Quesada Sanz, Fernando (2008). Armas de Grecia y Roma (in Spanish). Madrid: La Esfera de los Libros.
- Sáez Abad, Rubén (2005). "Polifemo". Artillería y poliorcética en el mundo grecorromano (in Spanish). Madrid: CSIC. ISBN 84-86547-88-1.
- Soedel, W.; Foley, V. (1979). "Catapultas antiguas". Investigación y Ciencia, 32 (in Spanish). pp. 92–101.
- Treziny, H. (1986). "Les techniques grecques de fortification et leur diffusion à la phéripherie du mond grec d'Occident". «La fortification dans l'histoire du monde grec», Actes du Colloque International, 1982 (in French). Paris: Editions du Centre national de la recherche scientifique. pp. 185–201.
- Wasowicz, C. (1986). "Le systeme de défense des cités grecques sur les côtes septentrionales de la mer Noire". La fortification dans l'histoire du monde grec. Actes du Colloque International, 1982 (in French). Paris: Editions du Centre national de la recherche scientifique. pp. 79–95.
- Winter, F. E. (1971). Greek Fortifications. Routledge & Kegan Paul. ISBN 978-0608154244.
