= Mare di Levante =

Greek ropax ferry

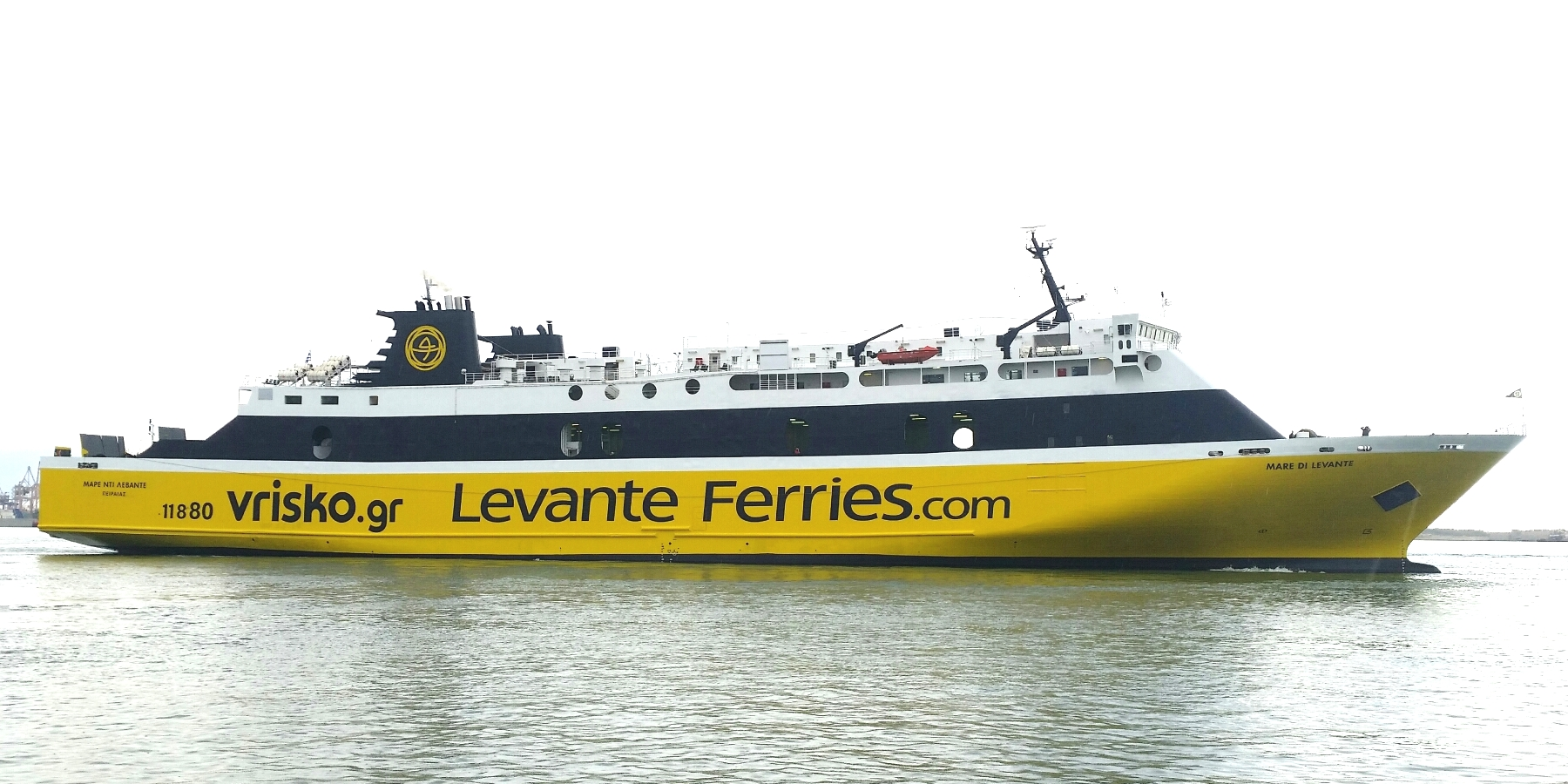
- Mare di Levante

History
- Name: (1984–1994): Niihama 2; (1994–1999): Kukjae Express Ferry No 2; (1999–2003): Sea World Express Ferry; (2003–2016): Ionian Star; (2016–present): Mare di Levante
- Owner: (1984–1994): Shikoku Chuo Ferry Boat; (1994–2003): Kuk Jae Express Co.; (2003–2016): Tyrogalas Shipping; (2016–present): Levante Ferries Maritime Co.
- Operator: (1984–1994): Shikoku Chuo Ferry Boat; (1994–2003): Kuk Jae Express; (2003–2016): Tyrogalas Lines; (2016–present): Levante Ferries
- Port of registry: (1984–1994): Japan; (1994–2003): South Korea; (2003–present): Piraeus, Greece
- Route: Kyllini – Zakynthos; Kyllini – Poros (Kefalonia)
- Builder: Jyuko Kochi / Shin Kurushima Dockyard; Kochi, Japan
- Launched: 1984
- Completed: 1984
- Acquired: 2015 (Purchased by Levante Ferries)
- Maiden voyage: 1984
- In service: 1984 (Japan) / 2003 (Greece)
- Identification: IMO number: 8405191; Call sign: SVAG6; MMSI number: 240015000
- Status: In service
- Notes: Heavily rebuilt and structurally altered in South Korea (1994) and further modernized in Greece (2003 and 2015/16) to maximize passenger spaces and introduce modern amenities for the Ionian Sea trade.

General characteristics (following Greek conversions and modernizations)
- Tonnage: 4,059 GT; 2,485 DWT
- Length: 120.2 m (394 ft 4 in)
- Beam: 21.02 m (69 ft 0 in)
- Draft: 4.5 m (14 ft 9 in)
- Installed power: 2* MaK 6MU552 diesel
- Propulsion: Twin screw
- Speed: 17.0 knots (service); 18.0 knots (max)
- Capacity: 1,068 passengers; 350 cars

Mare di Levante is a ferry operated by the Greek shipping company Levante Ferries, originally launched in 1984 as Niihama 2. It has been operating on the Zakynthos to Kyllini route since 2003.

== Service ==
Launched on 1 February 1984 at the Kochi Jyuko shipyard in Kochi as Niihama 2 and delivered on 20 May of the same year to Shikoku Chuo Ferry Boat, she entered service on 1 June on the services between Osaka, Kobe, Kawanoe and Niihama together with her sister ship Kawanoe 2 In 1995, it was sold to South Korea's Kuk Jae Express Co. and, renamed KukJae Express Ferry No. 2, was transferred to the Mokpo - Jeju route. In 1999 it was sold to the Sea World Express Ferry Company and, renamed Sea World Express Ferry, continued to operate on the same route.

In 2003 she was sold to the Greek company Tyrogalas Lines and, transferred to Perama, she underwent major refits, which increased her passenger capacity from 200 to just over 1000. During the refits, her bow was rebuilt, her stern was strengthened and new stabilisers and internal lounge areas were added. After the refits, she was renamed Ionian Star and entered service in the same year on the routes between Zakynthos and Killini on behalf of the joint venture between Tyrogalas Lines and Ionian Ferries.

In 2015, she was sold to Levante Ferries and, after a short period of service on the routes between Patras, Kefalonia and Ithaca, she was transferred to the Perama shipyard for some transformation works, during which, on 22 March 2016, she was renamed Mare di Levante. Once the works were completed, the ferry returned to service on the routes between Killini and Zakynthos under the new company's brand, also operating occasionally on the routes between Killini and Kefalonia.

== Accidents and Incidents ==
On 2 May 2026, while executing docking maneuvers at the port of Zakynthos, the Ro-Pax ferry Mare di Levante struck the pier with the left side of its stern. Strong, adverse weather conditions prevailing in the area—including northeast winds measuring between 7 and 8 on the Beaufort scale—were cited as the primary cause of the accident.

The vessel, which was concluding a scheduled crossing from Kyllini with 679 passengers, 180 cars, 18 trucks, 4 buses, and 7 motorcycles on board, managed to complete its arrival under its own power. All passengers and vehicles were safely disembarked and unloaded via the ferry's ramp once alongside the dock. No injuries were reported, and no environmental marine pollution was detected in the harbor. Following the collision, the Zakynthos Port Authority issued a temporary detention order prohibiting the vessel from departing until it underwent a full structural inspection and received a class maintenance certificate from its supervising classification society.
