= Lygia =

Lygia Λυγιά
- Community
- Location within Greece
- Coordinates: 37°52′N 21°09′E
- Country: Greece
- Administrative region: West Greece
- Regional unit: Elis
- Municipality: Pineios
- Municipal unit: Vartholomio

Population (2021)
  - Community: 741
- Time zone: UTC+2 (EET)
  - Summer (DST): UTC+3 (EEST)

Lygia (Greek: Λυγιά) is a village and a community in the municipal unit of Vartholomio, Elis, Greece. The community includes the villages Arkoudi, Glyfa, Ioniki and Paralia. Lygia is situated in the low hills of the southern part of the Kyllini peninsula, 3 km from the Ionian Sea. It is 4 km southeast of Kastro, 4 km east of Loutra Kyllinis and 4 km west of Vartholomio.

Arkoudi is the westernmost village of the community, 4 km southwest of Lygia, on the coast near Loutra Kyllinis. Its population was 77 in 2001. Glyfa is 2 km southwest of Lygia, and had 249 inhabitants in 2001. Paralia is 3 km south of Lygia, on the coast. It had 96 inhabitants. The village Ioniko is adjacent to the east of Paralia, and has no permanent residents.

== Population ==
Year	Population village	Community population
1981	-	542
1991	281	-
2001	276	698
2011	286	787
2021	277	741

== Train station ==
The village had a train station on the Vartholomio–Loutra Kyllinis railway, operated by the Hellenic State Railways. It was located at km 6.156 from Vartholomio. The station was opened on June 1, 1892 and closed in 1969 along with the railway line.

== See also ==
- List of settlements in Elis
