= Andreas Kalvos (ship) =

Ropax Ferry

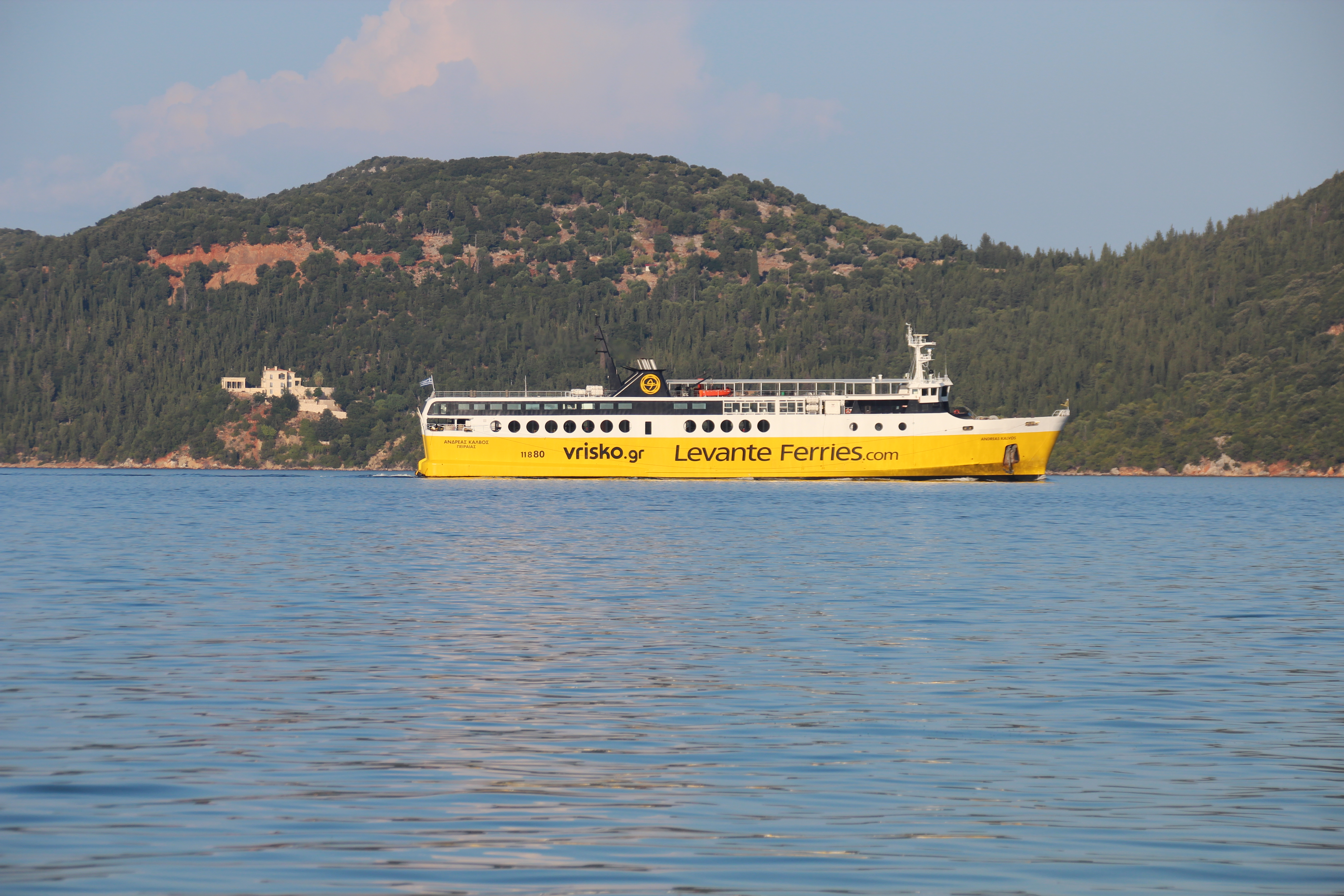
- Andreas Kalvos in Kefalonia

History
- Name: (1985–2000): Esan Maru No 5; (2000–2002): Tonia; (2002–present): Andreas Kalvos
- Namesake: Greek poet Andreas Kalvos
- Owner: (1985–2000): Donan Car Ferry Co. Ltd; (2002–2018): A.N.M.E.Z.; (2018–present): Levante Ferries
- Operator: (1985–2000): Donan Car Ferry; (2002–2018): A.N.M.E.Z.; (2018–present): Levante Ferries
- Port of registry: (1985–2000): Hakodate, Japan; (2000–present): Piraeus, Greece
- Route: Patras–Kefalonia–Ithaca
- Builder: Naikai Shipbuilding & Engineering Co. Ltd.; Setoda, Japan
- Yard number: 507
- Completed: 1985
- Acquired: 2018
- Maiden voyage: 1985
- In service: 1985
- Identification: IMO number: 8500484; Call sign: SXCA; MMSI number: 237416000
- Status: in service
- Notes: Extensively reconstructed and upgraded in 2002 and 2019

General characteristics (as rebuilt)
- Tonnage: 1,734 GT; 1,734 DWT
- Length: 98.56 m (323 ft 4 in)
- Beam: 16.24 m (53 ft 3 in)
- Draft: 4.35 m (14 ft 3 in)
- Depth: 5.40 m (17 ft 9 in)
- Decks: 5
- Ramps: 2 stern ramps
- Installed power: 2 × Daihatsu 8DLM-32L diesel engines (2 × 2800 BHP)
- Propulsion: Twin screw
- Speed: 16.0 knots (service); 17.5 knots (max)
- Capacity: 730 passengers (810 summer capacity); 225 cars
- Crew: 30
- Notes: Upgraded in 2015/2019 with side sponsons to comply with Stockholm Agreement stability rules.

Andreas Kalvos is a ferry belonging to the Greek shipping company Levante Ferries. Launched on 4 June 1985 at the Naikai Shipbuilding & Engineering Co. Ltd. shipyard in Setoda, Japan, the ro-ro ferry was completed and delivered to Dōnan Jidōsha Ferry on 22 August 1985. Named Esan Maru No. 5, the vessel subsequently entered commercial service across the Tsugaru Strait, operating on the company's maritime route between Aomori and Hakodate.

== Service ==
The ferry, launched on 4 June 1985 at the Naikai Shipbuilding & Engineering, Co. Ltd. shipyard in Setoda as a Ro-Ro with the name of Esan Maru No. 5 and delivered on 22 August to Dōnan Jidōsha Ferry, began service in the Tsugaru Strait, on the Merck services between Aomori and Hakodate.

On 29 December 2000 she was sold to the Cypriot Vourakis Shipping and, renamed Tonia, entered service in the 2001 summer season on freight services between Limassol and Piraeus.

On 27 December 2002 she was sold to the Greek company Zante Ferries, a joint venture between Ionian Ferries, Tyrogalas Ferries and ANEZ Lines, and, transferred to Perama, she underwent major refitting into a ferry, after which, on 8 February 2003, she was renamed Andreas Kalvos. In the same year she began service on the routes from Killini to the islands of Zakynthos and Kefalonia. On 1 November 2012, with the sale of the Strintzis Lines business, it was briefly employed on the connections between Patras, Kefalonia and Ithaca, before returning to operate on its own routes.

In 2015 she underwent another refit at Keratsini shipyard, during which sponsons were added to her stern. Once the work was completed, she was transferred to the Aegean, serving the routes between Piraeus, Kythnos, Serifos, Sifnos, Kimolos and Milos, joining her fleetmate Adamantios Korais.

In 2017,after two years in service on the connections between Piraeus and the Western Cyclades, it was again transferred to the connections between Killini and the islands of Zakynthos and Kefalonia, being replaced in the Aegean by the Dionisios Solomos.

On 17 December 2018 it was sold to Levante Ferries, returning to operate on the connections between Patras, Kefalonia and Ithaca in July 2019.

Since 2020, it has been used in the summer season on connections between Killini, Zakynthos and Kefalonia, and in the winter season on connections between Patras, Kefalonia and Ithaca.

== Accidents and Incidents ==
On the morning of 17 November 2024, the ro-ro passenger ferry Andreas Kalvos allided with the quay at the port of Sami on the island of Kefalonia, Greece, while performing a mooring maneuver. At the time of the accident, the vessel was arriving on its regular service route from Patras with 157 passengers, 33 crew members, and 38 vehicles on board.

The collision resulted in hull damage to the starboard side of the vessel's stern. All passengers were able to disembark safely, and no injuries or marine environmental pollution were reported. Following the incident, the Sami Port Department detained the Andreas Kalvos, halting its scheduled return voyage to Patras until necessary structural repairs could be executed and a formal certificate of seaworthiness was issued by its monitoring classification society.
