= Battle of Naupactus =

Naval battle of the Peloponnesian War

Coordinates: 38.3914°N 21.8297°E

- Part of the Peloponnesian War
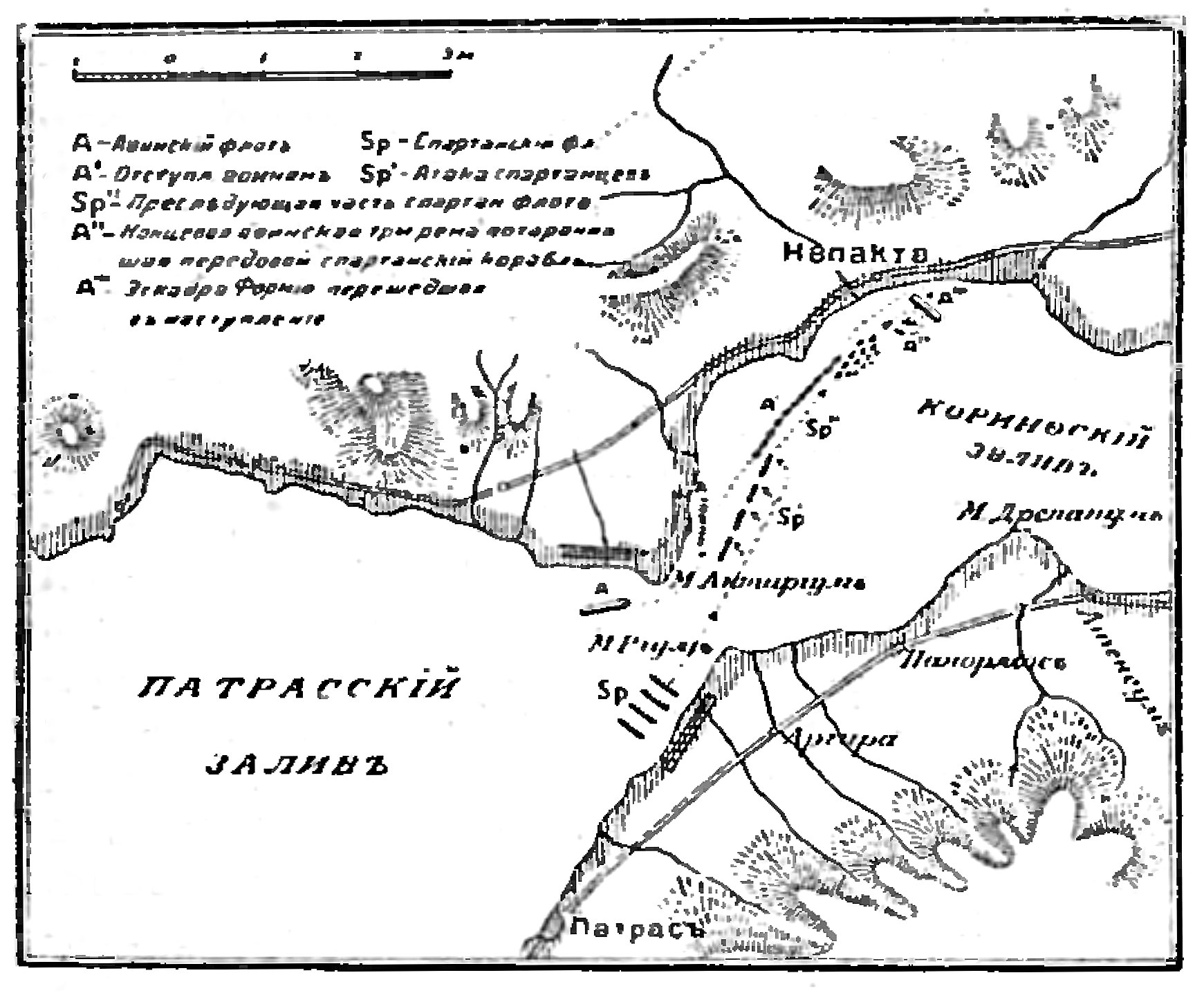
Date	429 BC
Location	off Naupactus
Result	Athenian victory

Belligerents
Athens	Korinth; Sparta

Commanders and leaders
Phormion	Knemos; Brasidas; Timokrates †; Lykophron; Machaon; Isokrates; Agatharchidas

Strength
20 ships	77 ships

Casualties and losses
1 ship captured	At least 1 ship sunk, 6 ships captured

The Battle of Naupactus was a naval battle in the Peloponnesian War. The battle, which took place a week after the Athenian victory at Rhium, set an Athenian fleet of twenty ships, commanded by Phormio, against a Peloponnesian fleet of seventy-seven ships, commanded by Cnemus.

In the battle, the Peloponnesians drew the Athenians out from their anchorage at Antirrhium by sailing into the Gulf of Corinth, moving as if to attack the vital Athenian base at Naupactus. The Athenians were forced to shadow their movements, sailing eastward along the northern shore of the gulf. Attacking suddenly, the Peloponnesians drove nine Athenian ships ashore and pursued the others towards Naupactus; victory seemed securely in their hands. At the entrance to the harbor of Naupactus, however, the last Athenian ship to reach the harbor turned the tide by circling around an anchored merchant ship to ram and sink its leading pursuer. Confusion set in among the Peloponnesians, and the newly emboldened Athenians set out after them and routed them.

In all, the Athenians recaptured all but one of their nine grounded ships and seized six Peloponnesian ships. This surprising victory preserved Athens' naval dominance and kept Naupactus secure; the arrival of an additional twenty Athenian ships shortly afterwards secured the victory and put an end to Sparta's attempt to take the offensive in the Northwest.

== Prelude ==
In 429 BC, the Spartan government had ordered the navarch Cnemus to launch an offensive in the Corinthian gulf and northwestern Greece aimed at knocking several Athenian allies out of the Peloponnesian War. Ideally, the Spartans hoped to capture the Athenian base at Naupactus, from which the Athenians had been harassing Corinthian shipping. That offensive, however, suffered a severe setback when Cnemus was turned back on land by the Acarnanians at Stratus, while a Peloponnesian fleet of forty-seven ships was routed by Phormio's twenty ships at Rhium. The Spartan government, dismayed by this unexpected reversal, dispatched several advisors (including the aggressive and talented Brasidas) to oversee Cnemus as he resumed the offensive. Phormio, meanwhile, sent to Athens for reinforcements, and twenty ships were sent out to him; these were ordered to first sail to Crete to attack Cydonia, and as a result did not arrive in time to participate in the battle.

Cnemus and the advisors, combining the ships that Cnemus had taken with him to Stratus with those retreating from Rhium and raising more ships levied from Sparta's allies on the gulf, had soon assembled a fleet of seventy-seven ships. The admirals then advanced with this fleet to Panormus, in Achaea, where they met up with the Peloponnesian infantry. Phormio, meanwhile, brought his ships up to Antirrhium, across the strait of Rhium from the Peloponnesians. Here, he was in position to move against the enemy fleet if it attempted to sail west into the open sea; if he allowed it to escape in this way, he would essentially have surrendered Athens' dominance over the sea, and might well have found himself blockaded in Naupactus.

== Battle ==
With the fleets at anchor across the strait from each other, it fell to the Peloponnesians to initiate a battle, as they wished to force an action before the Athenian reinforcements arrived. After six or seven days at Rhium, therefore, the Spartan commanders led their fleet eastward into the Corinthian Gulf. The Athenians, who in the previous battle had been able to take advantage of their superior maneuverability in the open sea, were reluctant to enter the constricted waters of the Gulf, but were forced to follow the Peloponnesians in order to protect Naupactus, which had been left ungarrisoned.

The twenty Athenian ships entered the gulf sailing in single file along the northern shore; the Messenian hoplites from Naupactus marched along the shore beside them. On the southern shore, the Peloponnesian fleet was sailing in four lines, parallel to the shore. On the right of these lines, leading the advance into the gulf, were the twenty best and fastest ships in the fleet, which had been assigned the job of preventing the Athenians from escaping when the Peloponnesians attacked.

Seeing the Athenians in the gulf and sailing in single file, Cnemus gave the signal for his ships to attack. The Peloponnesian fleet turned at once and raced across the gulf at the Athenians. The Athenians attempted to flee, but only the eleven leading ships were able to slip around the Peloponnesian right wing and flee towards Naupactus; the remaining nine were cornered, driven ashore, and captured, while the twenty elite Peloponnesian ships from the right wing set out after the fleeing Athenian eleven.

Ten Athenian ships reached Naupactus safely and took up positions at the mouth of the harbor, prows facing outwards, ready to defend against any attempt to enter the harbor. The last Athenian ship was fleeing towards the harbor, with the Peloponnesians (who were already chanting the victory paean) pursuing it closely, when it came alongside a merchant ship anchored outside the harbor. Using the merchant ship to protect its flanks while he turned, the Athenian captain spun his ship 270 degrees and rammed his leading pursuer in the side, sinking it. Although the Peloponnesians still held a great numerical advantage, the shock of this single action, which disheartened the Peloponnesian crews and reinvigorated the Athenians, proved sufficient to turn the tide of the battle. Confusion set in among the Peloponnesians; some rowers in leading ships dropped their oars to allow the main body to catch up with them—thus leaving themselves immobile and vulnerable in the face of an enemy force; other ships ran aground as a result of their captains' ignorance of the coastline. The ten Athenian ships in the harbor rushed out and joined the attack, and the Peloponnesians were instantly routed. The Athenians captured six ships in the pursuit, and recovered all but one of their own ships which had been taken earlier. Although both sides claimed victory and set up trophies, it was clear who had won the battle; the Peloponnesians, fearing the arrival of the Athenian reinforcements, retreated to Corinth under cover of darkness several days after the battle, and the Athenians continued to hold Naupactus and dominate the gulf.

== Aftermath ==
The Athenian victory at Naupactus put an end to Sparta's attempt to challenge Athens in the Corinthian gulf and the Northwest, and secured Athens' dominance at sea. At Naupactus, the Athenians' backs had been against the wall; a defeat there would have lost Athens its foothold in the Corinthian gulf and encouraged the Peloponnesians to attempt further aggressive operations at sea. In 428 BC, the Spartans would be so cowed by the memory of their defeats at Phormio's hands that they sent no aid to Athens' rebellious subject Mytilene in that year. In 427, when they finally did send a fleet, the commander was so afraid of being caught at sea by the Athenians that he fled home without accomplishing anything.
