= Kefalonian Lines =

Greece-based ferry company

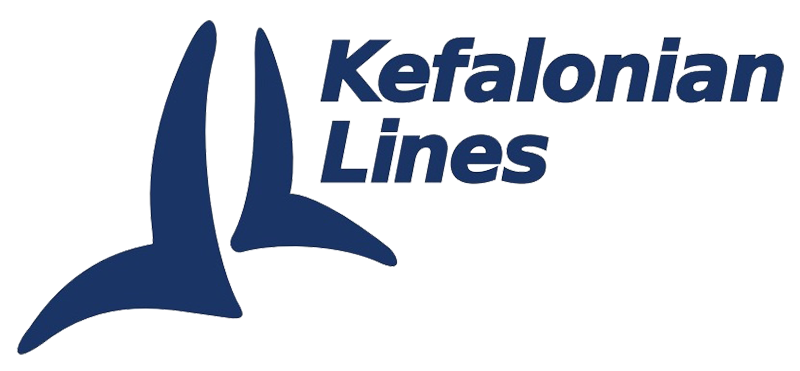
- Industry: Shipping
- Founded: 2013
- Founder: Stefanos Likoudis
- Defunct: 2018
- Headquarters: Athens, Greece
- Area served: Ionian Sea
- Services: Passenger transportation, Freight transportation
- Website: kefalonianlines.com

Kefalonian Lines was a Greece-based ferry company that got established in 2013 to completely cover the transportation needs of Cephalonia and the neighbouring island, Zakynthos. The company ceased operations in 2018.

== Former Fleet ==
- Nissos Kefalonia (2013-2018) serving now as Kefalonia for Levante Ferries
- Zakynthos I (2014-2018) currently laid up in Perama
- Alexandra L. (2018) scrapped in 2025 as Lexa
