= Otus of Cyllene =

Participant in the Trojan War

In Greek mythology, Otus (Ancient Greek: Ὦτος) was a hero from Cyllene, Elis. He participated in the Trojan War with Meges, commander of the Epeians. He was killed by Polydamas.
