= Panormus (Achaea) =

Coordinates: 38°19′00″N 21°49′00″E

Panormus or Panormos (Ancient Greek: Πάνορμος) was a harbour of ancient Achaea, 15 stadia east of the promontory of Rhium. During the Peloponnesian War, it was at Panormus, in 429 BCE, that the Spartan fleet and infantry united prior to the Battle of Naupactus.

Its site is located near the modern Tekes.
