= Vartholomio–Loutra Kyllinis railway =

Railway line in Greece

Overview
- Native name: Σιδηροδρομική Γραμμή Βαρθολομιού – Λουτρών Κυλλήνης
- Locale: Elis, Greece
- Termini: Vartholomio; Loutra Kyllinis
- Stations: 5

History
- Opened: 1 June 1892
- Closed: 1969

Technical
- Line length: 10.841 km (6.736 mi)
- Number of tracks: single
- Track gauge: 1,000 mm (3 ft 3 3/8 in) metre gauge
- Electrification: none

The Vartholomio – Loutra Kyllinis railway line (Greek: Σιδηροδρομική Γραμμή Βαρθολομιού – Λουτρών Κυλλήνης) was a meter gauge railway line of the Piraeus, Athens and Peloponnese Railways (SPAP). It branched off the Kavasila–Kyllini railway line at the railway station of Vartholomio, 1 km north of the town at km 5.895 of that line.

The Vartholomio – Loutra Kyllinis line was opened on June 1, 1892. Its construction coincided with the start of the exploitation of the hot springs at Loutra Kyllinis (the name means "Kyllini baths") by the SPAP, which constructed spa facilities, hotels and parks there. The line was shut down in 1969.

The line was first known as the Vartholomio–Lintzi line, as Loutra Kyllinis was previously known by the name of Lintzi.

== Stations ==
- Vartholomio
- Vranas
- Lygia
- Arkoudi
- Loutra Kyllinis
