= Kavasila–Kyllini railway =

Railway line in Greece

Kozani–Amyntaio railway

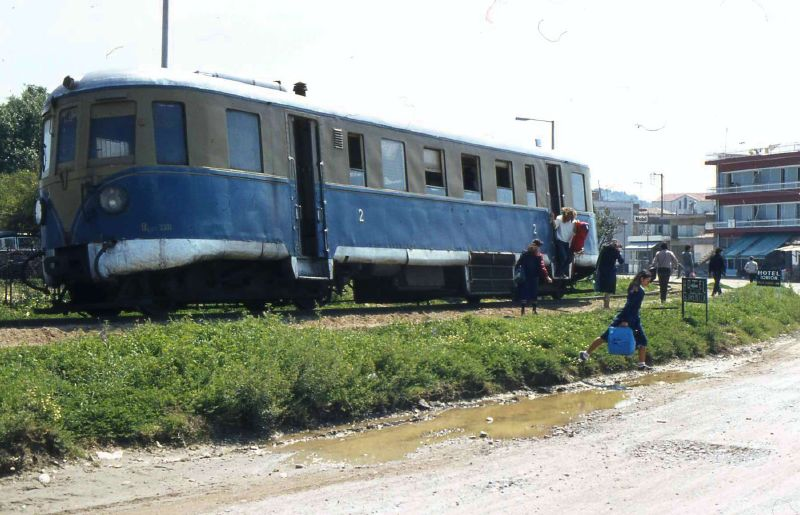
- Passenger train to Diesel, at Killini, 1981

Overview
- Status: Partially Dismantled
- Owner: GAIAOSE
- Locale: Greece (Peloponnese)
- Termini: Kavasila 37.875396°N 21.266785°E; Kyllini
- Stations: 12

Service
- Type: railway line
- Services: Regional
- Operator: Hellenic Train

History
- Opened: 1891; 135 years ago
- Closed: 1996; 30 years ago

Technical
- Line length: 17 km (11 mi)
- Number of tracks: single track
- Track gauge: 1,435 mm (4 ft 8 1/2 in) standard gauge
- Electrification: No
- Operating speed: 40 km/h (25 mph) (highest)

The Kavasila–Kyllini railway (Greek: Σιδηροδρομική Γραμμή Καβασίλων - Κυλλήνης) was a meter gauge railway line of the Piraeus, Athens and Peloponnese Railways (SPAP) in Elis, Greece. It branched off the Patras–Kyparissia railway at the railway station of Kavasila. This 17 km (11 mi) long line served the port of Kyllini, from which ferries sail to Zakynthos island. Services on this branch started in August 1891 and lasted until 1988, with full services and with limited services until 1996, when the line was closed down. It has been partially dismantled since then.

== Route ==
The route of the line is characterized by long straight sections and few significant slopes due to the fact that it runs through the plains of Elis. It has three stations that are now abandoned. The first is that of Kavassila at PK 64.555 of the line from Patras to Pyrgos (in Greek : γραμμή Πάτρας - Πύργου ), with four tracks, the first two of which gave access to the Kyllini line. The second is located at PK 5.985 and has three tracks, the third of which headed towards the junction to Loutra Kyllinis. The last station of the line is in the municipality of Kyllini, has three tracks and two dead-end sidings. Beyond this, the line extended 600 m to reach the port of Kyllini.

== Stations ==
The stations on the line, inclouod Vartholomio, Neochori and Kyllini. At Vartholomio the Vartholomio–Loutra Kyllinis railway branched off.

== History ==
Services on this branch started in August 1891 and lasted until 1988, with full services and with limited services until 1996, when the line was closed down. It has been partially dismantled since then.

Until the mid-1980s, the line saw up to 8 pairs of trains running daily. Since the winter of 1990, due to low traffic during the winter period, but also due to the unavailability of rolling stock, the service has been limited to the summer period (June–September). During the summer of 1994 and 1995 the service, although it appeared standard in the stations in the timetables, was in fact erratic 1 . Trains ran if there was availability of equipment. As a result, the customer base was dramatically reduced. In the summer of 1996, due to a significant shortage of rolling stock, the service was temporarily suspended and resumed in September 1996, only to be definitively cancelled at the end of December 1996. The line has suffered from vandalism in the years since the services where discontinued.

== Rolling stock ==
Steam locomotives were assigned to this line from the start of operation until the end of steam traction in the Peloponnese in the late 1970s. During the 1980s, single-car railcars of the 2101 series and the two-car railcars of the 4201 series dating from 1937 were used. After their withdrawal in 1986, the three-car railcars of the 6001 series were replaced, but these, due to their age, were often damaged and cancellations of some trains were an almost daily occurrence. As a result, they were replaced in the summer of 1994, first by two-car railcars of the 6521 series and then by three-car railcars of the 6461 series. However, due to a lack of rolling stock, the last trains on the line during the winter of 1996-1997 consisted of a diesel locomotive of the 9401 series pulling one or two cars.
