= Phormio =

5th-century BCE Athenian general

Phormio (Greek: Φορμίων Phormion, gen.: Φορμίωνος), the son of Asopius, was an Athenian general and admiral before and during the Peloponnesian War. A talented naval commander, Phormio commanded at several famous Athenian victories in 428 BC, and was honoured after his death with a statue on the acropolis and a state funeral. He is considered one of Athens' many great admirals, alongside Themistocles and Cimon.

== Early commands ==
Phormio first appears in the historical record in 440 BC, when he shared with Thucydides, Hagnon, and others the command of the Athenian fleet in the later part of the Samian War. In 432 BC, he commanded a force of 1600 hoplites sent to assist in the siege of Potidaea. Phormio led his men up slowly from the side of the city that the Athenians had not yet surrounded and constructed a counter-wall to complete Potidaea's investment. After Potidaea was firmly besieged, Phormio led his men in a successful campaign against Athens' enemies in the Chalcidice, and in the next year he again led an army attacking the Chalcidians, this time alongside Perdiccas II, king of Macedon.

== Naupactus ==
In the winter of 429/8 BC, Phormio was sent out to the Corinthian Gulf as commander of a fleet of 20 triremes; establishing his base at Naupactus, Phormio instituted a blockade of Corinthian shipping. In the summer of 429 BC, however, Sparta began preparing a sizeable fleet and army to attack Athens' allies in the region, hoping to overrun Acarnania on land, capture the islands of Zacynthus and Cephallenia, and possibly even take Naupactus. Phormio was notified of these plans by the concerned Acarnanians, but was initially unwilling to leave Naupactus unprotected. When the Peloponnesian fleet began moving along the south shore of the Corinthian gulf, however, aiming to cross over to Acarnania, the Athenians followed along the north shore and attacked them once they passed out of the Gulf into the open sea and attempted to cross from the south to the north.

In the ensuing battle, Phormio utilized a unique and unorthodox tactic. The Peloponnesians, despite their superior numbers (they had 47 ships to the Athenians' 20, although many of their vessels were loaded with heavy infantry) pulled their ships into a defensive circle, prows facing outwards. Phormio with his ships circled around the Peloponnesian fleet, driving the circle ever tighter. The tactic was a risky one—it left the Athenians' flanks utterly vulnerable to ramming—but it paid off when a wind blew up and caused the inexperienced crews of the circled vessels to foul their oars. In this moment of confusion, the Athenians rushed in and routed the remaining ships of the fleet, seizing 12 of them.

In a second battle shortly after this, Phormio and his small force triumphed against an even larger Peloponnesian fleet of 77 ships. Drawn into the narrow waters of the Corinthian gulf to protect Naupactus, the Athenians were initially routed and divided, but 11 Athenian ships which were pursued into Naupactus were able to turn about on their pursuers and defeat the numerically superior force opposite them. This victory preserved Athenian naval supremacy in the Gulf and put an end to Peloponnesian attempts to challenge it during this period of the war.

== Legacy ==
After a single land campaign in 428 BC in Acarnania, Phormio is not recorded as having held command again. In his few years of activity, however, he had left a deep imprint on the early course of the Peloponnesian War. An Athenian defeat in the Corinthian Gulf in 429/8 BC would have been a devastating blow to Athens' influence in the Greek north-east, and to the city's reputation for naval invincibility. After his death, the Athenians commemorated his service to the state by erecting a statue of him on the acropolis and burying his body in the state cemetery.

Phormio's son, named Asopius after his grandfather, also commanded a naval expedition during the war.
