= Cnemus =

Spartan navarch from 430 to 429/428 BC

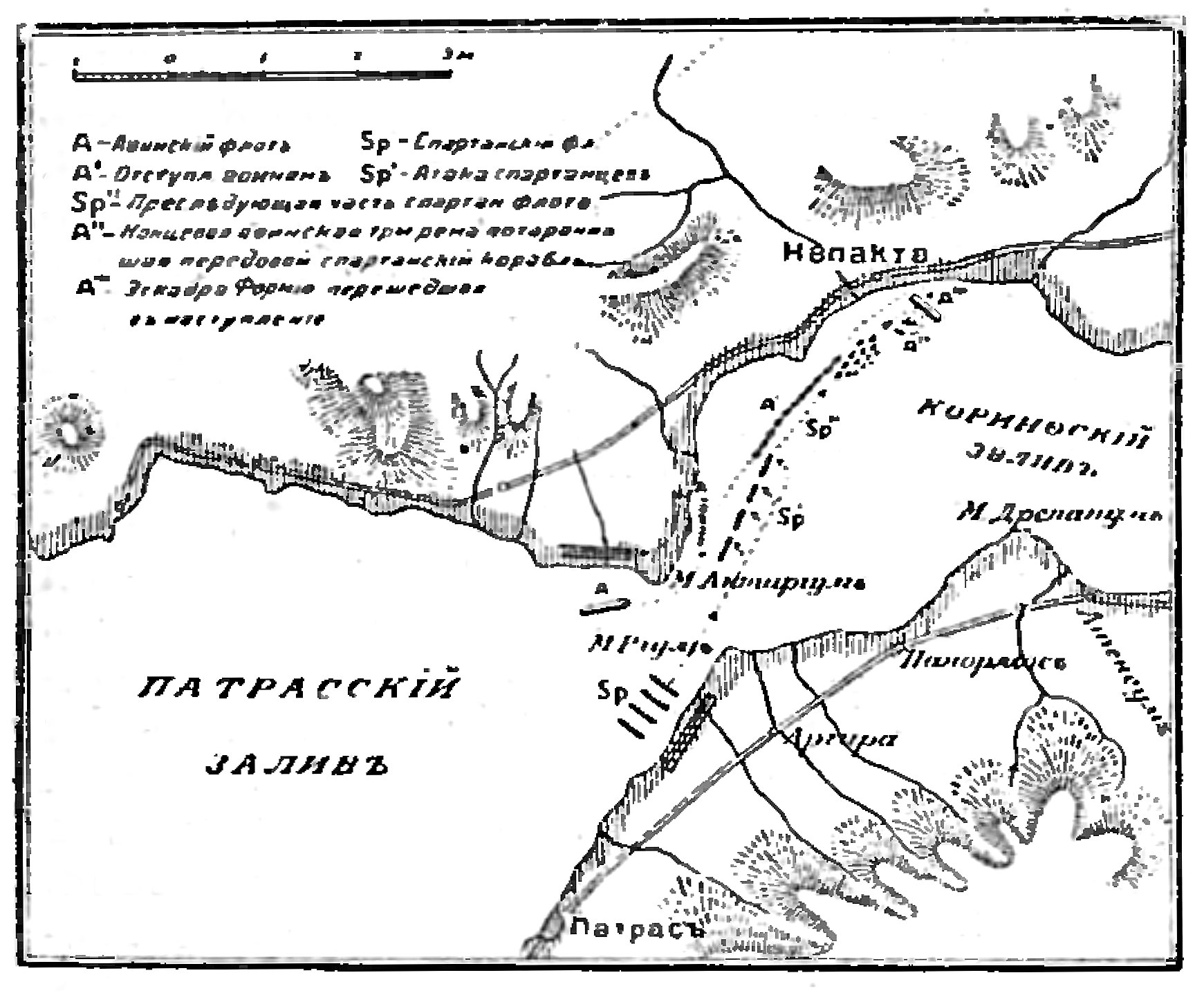
The Battle of Naupactus was a naval battle in the Peloponnesian War. The battle, which took place a week after the Athenian victory at Rhium, set an Athenian fleet of twenty ships, commanded by Phormio, against a Peloponnesian fleet of seventy-seven ships, commanded by Cnemus.

Cnemus (Greek: Κνῆμος) was the Spartan fleet commander during the second and third years (430–29 BC) of the Archidamian War. During his command, Cnemus oversaw a series of operations that met with failure. As a result, the Spartans began to question Cnemus' leadership and sent several advisers to assist him in his command.

== Military service ==
=== Zacynthian Campaign ===
Cnemus' earliest recorded military operation during the Archidamian War occurred in the summer of 430 BC, at the island of Zacynthus. Because Zacynthus was populated by Achaeans who had allied themselves with Athens, Cnemus led an expedition, made up of Spartans and their allies, against the island. The expeditionary force consisted of 100 ships, carrying a total of 1000 Spartan hoplites. Although Cnemus' forces destroyed much of Zacynthus, when they realized that the island's population would refuse to surrender, the expeditionary force returned home, having achieved little.

=== Acarnanian Campaign ===
The summer following the Zacynthian Campaign (429 BC), Cnemus led an expedition against Acarnania. Two of Sparta's allies, the Ambraciots and Chaonians, had convinced the Spartans to invade Acarnania with the purpose of eventually capturing the islands of Cephallenia and Zacynthus. As the Ambraciots and Chaonians argued, if the campaign succeeded, the Spartans would gain strategic positions, thus enabling them to complicate the Athenians' navigation around the Peloponnesus. As a result of these urgings, the Spartans decided to send a land force, led by Cnemus, to the Ambracian Gulf to prepare for the invasion of Acarnania. At the same time, Spartan allies including Corinth, Sicyon, Leucas, Anactorium, and Ambracia prepared to send a fleet to limit the coastal Acarnanians' ability to move against the Spartan land force in the Acarnanian interior.

Cnemus' land force consisted of both Hellenes and barbarians. The Hellenic forces included 1000 Spartan hoplites, as well as Ambraciots, Leucadians, and Anactorians. In addition to 1000 Chaonians, the barbarian forces included Thesprotians and Molossians, among others.

Upon the land force's arrival in the Ambracian Gulf, rather than waiting for the allied fleet to arrive as well, Cnemus began advancing his troops towards the Acarnanian capital of Stratus, destroying the Amphilochian village of Limnaea along the way. Cnemus believed that with the conquest of Stratus, the rest of Acarnania would quickly fall under Spartan control. As the land force approached Stratus, Cnemus divided his troops into three divisions. The left division was constituted of Spartans and Ambraciots, with Cnemus himself leading. The center division contained Chaonians and other barbarians. The right division was made up of Leucadians and Anactorians. Cnemus’ plan was that the three divisions would encamp outside Stratus and would regroup to attack the city's walls if negotiations with the Stratians failed. However, as the left and right divisions (the Hellenic divisions) found suitable positions and began to encamp, the center division, led by the Chaonians, continued to advance. Without making Cnemus or the other divisions aware of their intentions, the center division sought to capture Stratus alone because, according to the historian Thucydides, they hoped to secure all the glory of the battle for themselves. Seeing the center division's advance, the Stratians entrenched themselves and prepared ambushes throughout the city. Upon its arrival, the center division was engaged by the Stratians in close combat. Caught by surprise, the center division was routed and fled back to Cnemus’ camp. The encamped divisions, only realizing what had happened as the center division fled into their midst, formed ranks and held their position for the rest of the day. The Stratians, lacking reinforcements, did not engage Cnemus’ land force further.

That night, Cnemus moved his forces away from Stratus. The next day, knowing that Acarnanian reinforcements were coming from the coast, he retreated to the allied city of Oeniadae. From Oeniadae, the land force disbanded, each group returning to its native country.

At the same time as the battle at Stratus, the fleet that was supposed to support Cnemus was drawn into battle at Naupactus by the Athenian admiral Phormio. Not having expected to engage in a sea battle, the Spartan fleet consisted primarily of ships suited only for transporting troops rather than for fighting. This, along with the fact that Phormio's men were more experienced in naval warfare than the Spartans, gave Phormio the confidence to attack the Spartans’ forty-seven ships with his twenty. Taking advantage of the Spartan fleet's inexperience, Phormio developed a strategy to create confusion among the Spartan ships and was thus able to rout their forces, capturing twelve enemy ships by the end of the battle. The surviving Spartan ships sailed to Cyllene, where they regrouped with Cnemus.

=== Aftermath of the Acarnanian Campaign ===
Upon receiving news of the failure of the Acarnanian Campaign, the Spartans became greatly dissatisfied with Cnemus’ command of the fleet. Although Cnemus was not present at the Spartan naval force's defeat at Naupactus, he being engaged at the time in Stratus, because he was the commander for the entire expedition, the Spartans held Cnemus responsible. As a result, three commissioners, Timocrates, Brasidas and Lycophron, were sent by the Spartans to make up for what they perceived as Cnemus’ lack of energy and to help him reorganize the fleet. The Spartans, for their part, were unwilling to concede that the smaller Athenian naval force had defeated the Spartan fleet at Naupactus because of their greater experience at sea.

=== Second Naval Battle at Naupactus ===
With the arrival of the three Spartan commissioners at Cyllene, Phormio began to prepare his ships for a second naval battle. Cnemus now had seventy-seven ships under his command and set anchor at Achaean Rhium. Phormio, with the same twenty ships from his victory at Naupactus, set anchor at Molycrian Rhium, directly across the Spartans at the mouth of the Crissaean Gulf. Aware that Phormio had sent to Athens for reinforcements, Cnemus and the other Spartan commanders sought to engage the Athenians as soon as possible. They also desired to wage the battle between the Rhia, so that the Athenians would be unable to employ the same strategy they had used at the first battle of Naupactus. Seeing that the Spartan troops were afraid of the prospect of battle, however, Cnemus and the Spartan commanders had to give a speech of encouragement to their troops before they could begin the engagement. The speech largely consisted of extolling the Spartans’ native valor and their superiority of numbers, as well as blaming the previous defeat at Naupactus on bad luck and the Spartans’ lack of naval experience.

Because Cnemus and the Spartan commanders desired to wage the battle in the narrows between the Rhia, they ordered their ships to sail towards Corinth in the hope that Phormio would interpret their departure as a move to attack the now-unguarded Naupactus and would follow them into the narrows. It is not clear whether this was Cnemus’ plan or the plan of one of his advisers; nonetheless, Cnemus was responsible for agreeing to implement the plan. Phormio, taking the Spartans’ bait, ordered his ships to sail along the shore, in single file, towards Naupactus. Taking advantage of the Athenians’ exposed position, the Spartans quickly turned their formation, hoping to cut the Athenians off before they reached Naupactus. Eleven of the Athenian ships escaped the Spartans’ manoeuvre; nine ships were disabled by the Spartans.

With the destruction of nearly half the Athenian fleet, the Spartan strategy seemed to be a success. The eleven remaining Athenian ships fled to Naupactus, pursued by twenty Spartan ships. Ten of the Athenian ships made it to the shore of Naupactus and positioned themselves so as to repel an attack, should the Spartans pursue them further. However, one Athenian ship remained in open water and was being closely pursued by a single Spartan ship. Suddenly turning around, the Athenian ship sank its pursuer. The rest of the pursuing Spartans, having become careless in their premature sense of victory and surprised by the sight of one of their own ships sunk by an enemy that had ostensibly been retreating, were suddenly overcome by a sense of panic. The Spartans quickly halted their pursuit and, as a consequence of their lack of familiarity with the local geography, ran several of their ships aground. Taking advantage of the chaos among the Spartans, the Athenians launched an attack in which they captured six Spartan ships and recovered the nine ships they had lost earlier. The Spartans proceeded to retreat to Panormus. Among the Spartan dead was Cnemus’ advisor, Timocrates, who, having been on board the first Spartan ship to be sunk, killed himself out of shame. Although both sides later claimed victory, the Spartans, concerned about imminent Athenian reinforcement, retreated to Corinth.

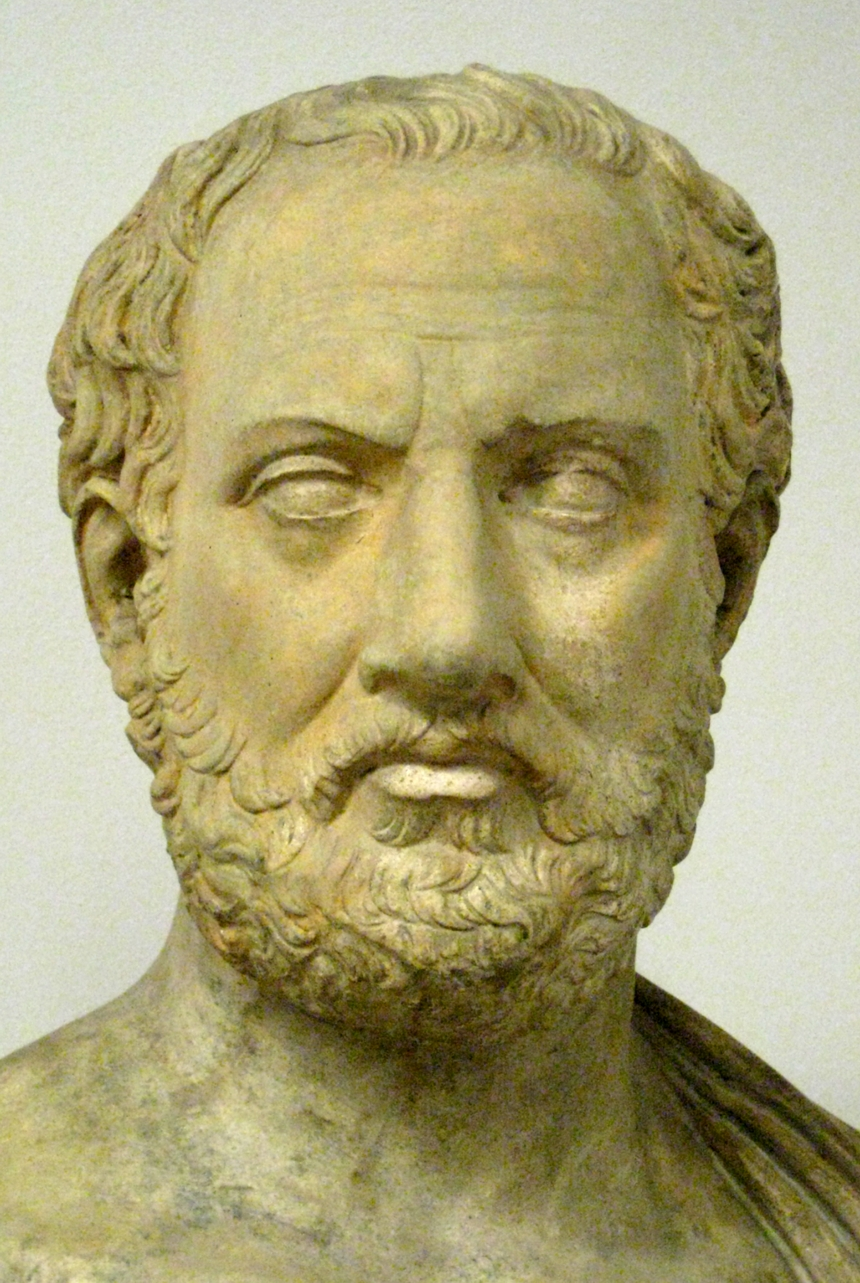
Some scholars claim that Thucydides implies in his History of the Peloponnesian War that Cnemus made the decision to abort the Megarian plan.

=== Plot to Capture the Piraeus ===
After arriving in Corinth, Cnemus and Brasidas allowed the Megarians to convince them to launch an attack on Athens’ port, the Piraeus. Although the blame for the Spartans’ second defeat at Naupactus lay primarily in the inexperience of their sailors, Cnemus’ willingness to retreat to Corinth rather than re-engage the Athenians cemented the Spartans’ perception that he was lacking in energy as a leader. Therefore, although it is not explicitly known why Cnemus and Brasidas agreed to the Megarian plan, some scholars have speculated that neither man was eager to return to Sparta without having gained at least one victory. Crossing from Corinth to Megara, the Spartans planned to launch forty ships and take the Athenians by surprise. The Athenians, aware of their naval superiority, never expected an open naval attack against the Piraeus. As a result, there was no fleet positioned to defend the port.

Although the execution of the Megarian plan initially seemed to go well, on the night that the Spartans began to sail to the Piraeus, they became afraid of the risk involved and altered their plan to the less ambitious goal of attacking the Athenian fort on Salamis. Although it is unknown who was responsible for the decision to abort the plan of attacking the Piraeus, certain scholars claim that Thucydides, in his History of the Peloponnesian War, implies Cnemus was responsible. When the Spartans attacked, they took the Athenians by surprise, capturing three Athenian ships and wreaking damage throughout the island. However, the Salaminians were able to send a signal to Athens, notifying them of the attack. The Athenians, thinking that the Spartans were either already attacking the Piraeus or just about to attack, fell into a panic. The following day, the Athenians mustered a ground force to bolster the defences of the Piraeus and launched their fleet to defend Salamis. The Spartans, becoming aware of this, fled back to Megara. As a result of this incident, the Athenians developed a number of measures to better guard the Piraeus in future. However, Cnemus and Brasidas had finally achieved a victory that allowed them to return to Sparta without disgrace.

== Cnemus in the History of the Peloponnesian War ==
According to H.D. Westlake, Cnemus was characterized by Thucydides in the History of the Peloponnesian War as a prototypical Spartan military leader in order to draw the general lesson of the inadequacy of conventional Spartan leadership. In Thucydides' characterization, Cnemus' similarities to the later Spartan fleet commander, Alcidas, may have been exaggerated to contrast and emphasize the superior leadership of the heterodox Brasidas. Thus, as Westlake argues, Cnemus may have been unfairly represented by Thucydides as largely responsible for Spartans' various military failures.
