= Kyllini, Elis =

Kyllini Κυλλήνη
- Community
- Location within Greece
- Coordinates: 37°56.1′N 21°8.7′E
- Country: Greece
- Administrative region: West Greece
- Regional unit: Elis
- Municipality: Andravida-Kyllini
- Municipal unit: Kastro-Kyllini

Population (2021)
  - Community: 534
- Time zone: UTC+2 (EET)
  - Summer (DST): UTC+3 (EEST)

Kyllini (Greek: Κυλλήνη) is a port town and a community in the municipal unit of Kastro-Kyllini, Elis, Greece. It is situated on the Ionian Sea coast, 11 km west of Andravida, 28 km northeast of Zakynthos and 39 km northwest of Pyrgos. From the port of Kyllini there are several ferry connections to the Ionian islands Zakynthos and Cephalonia. It was the terminus of the now dismantled Kavasila–Kyllini railway.

== History ==
Kyllini was first mentioned by Homer in his epic poem Iliad where Otos from Kyllini was killed during the Trojan War. The ruins of the medieval town Glarentza are situated in Kyllini. The town was named after Cyllene (Ancient Greek: Κυλλήνη), a port town of ancient Elis.

== Population ==
Year	Population
1991	952
2001	1079
2011	631
2021	534

== See also ==
- List of settlements in Elis
- Otus of Cyllene
