= The Birds (play) =

Comedy by Aristophanes

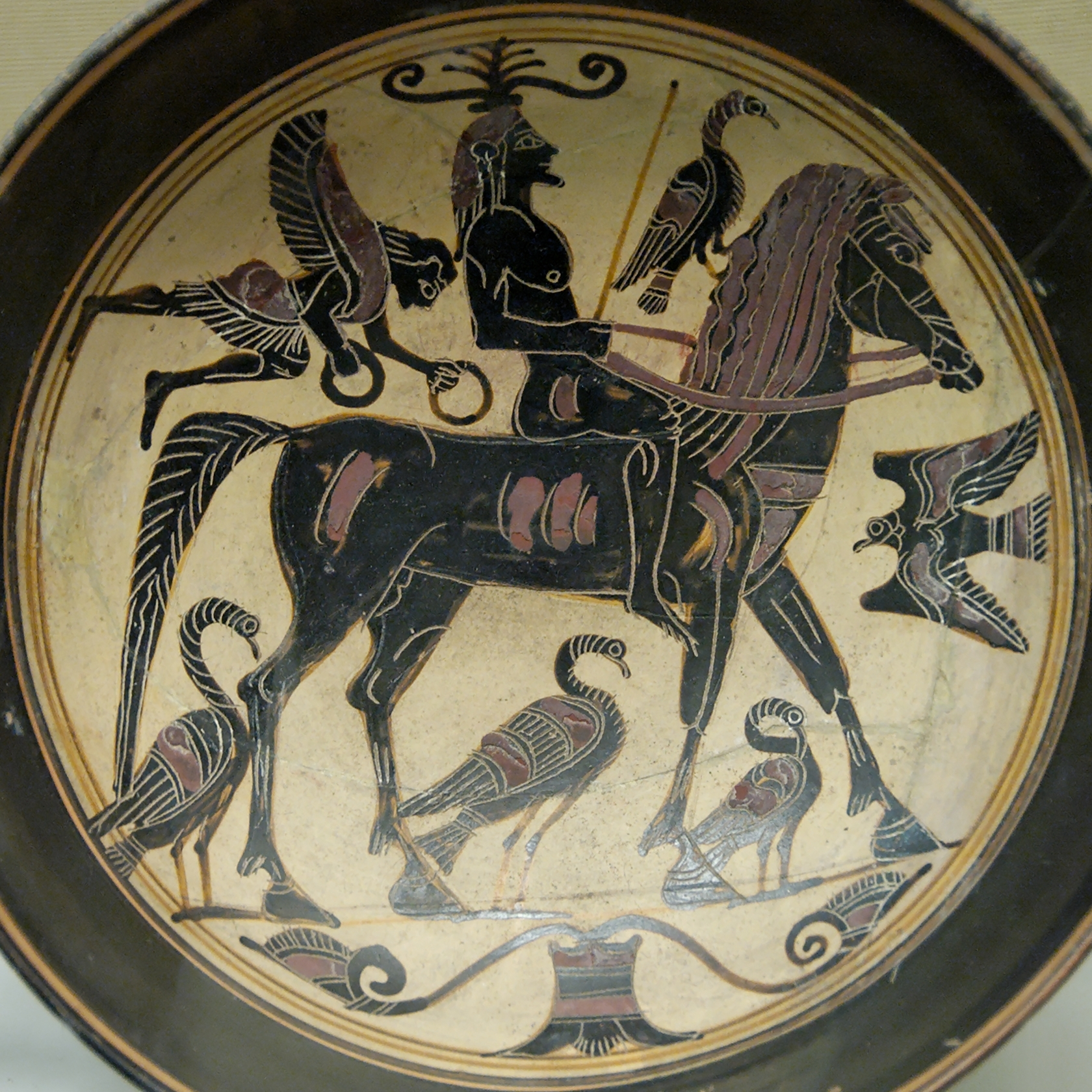
- Rider and birds Laconian kylix c. 540 B.C. The Dramatis Personae in ancient comedy depends on interpretation of textual evidence. This list is developed from D.Barrett's translation.
- Written by: Aristophanes
- Chorus: Birds: partridge, francolin, mallard, kingfisher, sparrow, owl, jay, turtledove, crested lark, reed warbler, wheatear, pigeon, merlin, sparrowhawk, ringdove, cuckoo, stock dove, firecrest, rail, kestrel, dabchick, waxwing, vulture, woodpecker
- Characters: Pisthetaerus citizen of Athens; Euelpides citizen of Athens; The Footbird servant to the Hoopoe; Hoopoe formerly Tereus, an Athenian prince; A priest (masked as a bird); A ragged poet; An oracle man; Meton famous mathematician; A statute seller; An inspector; 1st messenger (a bird); 2nd messenger (a bird); Iris daughter of Zeus; 3rd messenger (a bird); A rebellious youth; Cinesias famous poet; An informer; Prometheus titan and friend to Man; Poseidon god of the sea; Heracles divine protector of mankind; Triballus, God of barbarians; Heavenly herald; Xanthias slave to Pisthetaerus; Silent roles: Manes slave to Pisthetaerus; Bird dancers (flamingo, cock, 2nd Hoopoe, Gobbler); Nightingale formerly Procne (flute player); Raven piper; Sovereignty beauteous maid; Attendants as required
- Setting: A hillside wilderness outside the Hoopoe's nest

The Birds (Ancient Greek: Ὄρνιθες, romanized: Órnithes) is a comedy by the Ancient Greek playwright Aristophanes. It was performed in 414 BC at the City Dionysia in Athens where it won second place. It has been acclaimed by modern critics as a perfectly realized fantasy remarkable for its mimicry of birds and for the gaiety of its songs. Unlike the author's other early plays, it includes no direct mention of the Peloponnesian War and there are few references to Athenian politics, and yet it was staged not long after the commencement of the Sicilian Expedition, an ambitious military campaign that greatly increased Athenian commitment to the war effort. In spite of that, the play has many indirect references to Athenian political and social life. It is the longest of Aristophanes's surviving plays and yet it is a fairly conventional example of Old Comedy.

The plot of the play revolves around Pisthetaerus, an Athenian who convinces the birds to create a great city in the sky, and thus regain their status as the original gods. Pisthetaerus eventually transforms into a bird-like god himself, and replaces Zeus as the king of the gods.

== Plot ==
The play begins with two middle-aged men stumbling across a hillside wilderness, guided by a pet crow and a pet jackdaw. One of them advises the audience that they are fed up with life in Athens, where people do nothing all day but argue over laws, and they are looking for Tereus, a king who was once metamorphosed into the Hoopoe, for they believe he might help them find a better life somewhere else. Just then, a very large and fearsome bird emerges from a camouflaged bower, demanding to know what they are up to and accusing them of being bird-catchers. He turns out to be the Hoopoe's servant. They appease him and he returns indoors to fetch his master. Moments later the Hoopoe himself appears—a not very convincing bird who attributes his lack of feathers to a severe case of moulting. He is happy to discuss their plight with them, and meanwhile one of them has a brilliant idea: the birds, he says, should stop flying about like idiots and instead should build themselves a great city in the sky, since this would both allow them to lord it over men and enable them to blockade the Olympian gods in the same way that the Athenians had recently starved the island of Melos into submission. The Hoopoe likes the idea, and he agrees to help implement it, provided, of course, that the two Athenians can first convince all the other birds. He calls to his wife, the Nightingale, and bids her to begin her celestial music. The notes of an unseen flute swell through the theatre, and meanwhile the Hoopoe provides the lyrics, summoning the birds of the world from their different habitats—birds of the fields, mountain birds and birds of the trees, birds of the waterways, marshes and seas. These soon begin to appear, and each of them is identified by name on arrival. Four of them dance together while the rest form into a Chorus.

On discovering the presence of men, the newly arrived birds fly into a fit of alarm and outrage, for mankind has long been their enemy. A skirmish follows, during which the Athenians defend themselves with kitchen utensils that they find outside the Hoopoe's bower, until the Hoopoe at last manages to persuade the Chorus to give his human guests a fair hearing. The cleverer of the two Athenians, the author of the brilliant idea, then delivers a formal speech, advising the birds that they were the original gods and urging them to regain their lost powers and privileges from the johnny-come-lately Olympians. The birds are completely won over and urge the Athenians to lead them in their war against the usurping gods. The clever one then introduces himself as Pisthetaerus (Trustyfriend), and his companion is introduced as Euelpides (Goodhope). They retire to the Hoopoe's bower to chew on a magical root that will transform them into birds. Meanwhile, the Nightingale emerges from her hiding place and reveals herself as an enchantingly feminine figure. She presides over the Chorus of birds while they address the audience in a conventional parabasis:

Hear us, you who are no more than leaves always falling, you mortals benighted by nature,
You enfeebled and powerless creatures of earth always haunting a world of mere shadows,
Entities without wings, insubstantial as dreams, you ephemeral things, you human beings:
Turn your minds to our words, our etherial words, for the words of the birds last forever!

The Chorus delivers a brief account of the genealogy of the gods, claiming that the birds are children of Eros and grandchildren of Night and Erebus, thus establishing their claim to divinity ahead of the Olympians. It cites some of the benefits the audience derives from birds (such as early warnings of a change in seasons), and it invites the audience to join them since birds easily manage to do things that mere men are afraid to do (such as beating up their fathers and committing adultery).

Pisthetaerus and Euelpides emerge from the Hoopoe's bower laughing at each other's unconvincing resemblance to a bird. After discussion, they name the city-in-the-sky Nephelokokkygia, or literally "cloud-cuckoo-land" (Νεφελοκοκκυγία), and then Pisthetaerus begins to take charge of things, ordering his friend to oversee the building of the city walls while he organizes and leads a religious service in honour of birds as the new gods. During this service, he is pestered by a variety of unwelcome visitors, including a young versifier out to hire himself to the new city as its official poet, an oracle-monger with prophecies for sale, a famous geometer, Meton, offering a set of town-plans, an imperial inspector from Athens with an eye for a quick profit, and a statute-seller trying to peddle a set of laws originally written for a remote, barely-heard-of town called Olophyx. Pisthetaerus chases off all these intruders and then retires indoors to finish the religious service. The birds of the Chorus step forward for another parabasis. They promulgate laws forbidding crimes against their kind (such as catching, caging, stuffing, or eating them), and they end by advising the festival judges to award them first place or risk getting defecated on.

Pisthetaerus returns to the stage moments before a messenger arrives with a report on the construction of the new walls: they are already finished thanks to the collaborative efforts of numerous kinds of birds. A second messenger then arrives with news that one of the Olympian gods has snuck through the defenses. A hunt is organized. The goddess Iris is detected and cornered, and soon she wafts down under guard. After being interrogated and insulted by Pisthetaerus, she is allowed to fly off to her father Zeus to complain about her treatment. Hardly has she gone when a third messenger arrives, declaring that men in their multitudes are now flocking to join the new city-in-the-sky.

Another set of unwelcome visitors arrives as advertised, singing due to the inspiration of the new city. One is a rebellious youth who exults in the notion that here at last he has permission to beat up his father. The famous poet, Cinesias, is next, waxing incoherently lyrical as the poetic mood takes hold of him. Third is a sycophant in raptures at the thought of prosecuting victims on the wing. All of them are sent packing by Pisthetaerus. Prometheus arrives next, sheltering under a parasol because he is an enemy of Zeus and he is trying not to be seen from the heavens. He has come with advice for Pisthetaerus: the Olympians are starving because men's offerings no longer reach them; they are desperate for a peace treaty, but Pisthetaerus shouldn't negotiate with them until Zeus surrenders both his sceptre and his girlfriend, Sovereignty—she is the real power in Zeus's household. His mission accomplished, Prometheus departs just moments before a delegation from Zeus arrives. There are only three delegates: the brother of Zeus, Poseidon, the oafish Heracles, and some even more oafish god worshipped by barbarians called Triballus. Pisthetaerus easily outwits Heracles, who in turn bullies the barbarian god into submission, and Poseidon is thus outvoted – the delegation accepts Pisthetaerus's terms. He is proclaimed king by a heavenly herald, and he is presented with Zeus's sceptre by Sovereignty, a vision of loveliness. The festive gathering departs amid the strains of the wedding march: Hymen O Hymenai'O! Hymen O Hymenai'O!

== Historical background ==
When The Birds was performed in 414 BC, Athenians were still optimistic about the future of the Sicilian Expedition, which had set out the year before under the joint command of Alcibiades, who had promoted it enthusiastically, and Athens' most experienced general, Nicias, who had opposed the venture. In spite of this public optimism, there was ongoing controversy in Athens over the mutilation of the Hermai, an act of impious vandalism that had cast ominous doubts over the Sicilian Expedition even before the fleet had left port. The vandalism had resulted in a 'witch-hunt' led by religious extremists and endorsed by priests of the Eleusinian Mysteries, leading to the persecution of rationalist thinkers such as Diagoras of Melos. Alcibiades himself was suspected of involvement in anti-religious activities and a state ship Salaminia was sent to Sicily to bring him back to trial. However, he managed to escape from custody and a reward of one talent of gold was subsequently offered by the Athenian authorities to anyone who could claim responsibility for his death. Alcibiades had already been a controversial figure in Athenian politics for some years before then – he had combined with Nicias to bring about the ostracism of the populist leader Hyperbolus. Hyperbolus was a frequent target of satire in Aristophanes' plays, a role previously filled by Cleon, who had died in 422.

=== Places and people mentioned in The Birds ===
Aristophanes wrote for the amusement of his fellow citizens and his plays are full of topical references. The following explanation of topical references in The Birds is based on the work of various scholars (commonplace references to conventional gods are omitted):

Places

- Libya: A region associated with the seasonal migration of cranes (lines 710, 1136), it allows for a pun on the Greek word libas (anything that drops or trickles) – Euelpides claims to be a Libyan bird on the grounds that he has wet himself with fear (65).
- Phasis River: Pisthetaerus claims to be a bird from this river because he wets himself with fear (line 68). A popular pun associates Phasian (phasianikos) with informers or sycophants (sycophantikos) – the pun however is developed more explicitly in The Acharnians (Acharnians line 725-6)
- Phalerum: An old port of Athens, it is a source of sardines (line 76), mentioned also in an earlier play.
- Salaminia: One of two Athenian ships reserved for state errands, it had recently been sent to Sicily to fetch Alcibiades back to Athens for trial. It is mentioned here as a good reason not to live near the sea (line 147). Iris resembles it and its sister ship Paralos as an errand-runner for the authorities (1204).
- Lepreus: A town in Elis, it is suggested by The Hoopoe as a good place to start a new life but it is rejected by Euelpides because it puns with leprosy, which reminds him of Melanthius, a poet whose skin was evidently as bad as his verse (line 149).
- Opuntian Locris: A coastal region of Greece opposite Euboea, it is another destination recommended by The Hoopoe but rejected by Euelpides because 'Opuntian' reminds him of Opuntius, a notorious sycophant with only one eye (line 152).
- Melos: An island that had rebelled against Athenian control, it had been starved into submission. It is mentioned here as an example of what might be done against the gods (line 186) and also because it is an epithet for Diagoras of Melos (1032), a notorious atheist outlawed from Athens (possibly due to public anger over the mutilation of the hermae). Melos is also mentioned in The Clouds as an epithet for a Diagoras-like figure (Socrates).
- Cerameicon: Athens' most conspicuous cemetery – Psithetaerus hopes to get a hero's burial there (line 395). It is mentioned also in The Knights and The Frogs.
- Delphi: The religious centre of Greece, it is referred to by that name (lines 618, 716) and also by its ancient name Pytho (lines 856, 870). Athenians could only reach it through Boeotia, enemy territory (189). There are many references to Delphi/Pytho in Aristophanes' other plays.
- Marathon: Often associated with Athens' victory against Persia, it also happened to be a prime habitat for birds (line 246). It is mentioned in other plays also.
- Orneae: A Peloponnesian town, it was destroyed by the Argives at about this time. It is mentioned because it allows for a pun on the Greek word for birds (line 399).
- Phrygia: A good source of wool (line 493), its people make a poor comparison with Athenians (762, 1244). There are references to it in two other plays.
- Alimos: A community on the Attic coast, it was the birthplace of the historian Thucydides. Euelpides was on his way there from Athens when he was once mugged (line 496).
- Egypt: It was once ruled by cuckoos (line 504). It was the home of the pyramid and yet nobody from there helped build the wall in the sky (1133). It is mentioned in other plays also.
- Phoenicia: This was another ancient land formerly ruled by cuckoos (line 504).
- Babylon: Its famous walls resemble those of Cloudcuckooland (line 552).
- Crioa or Krioa: A deme within the Antiochides tribe, it is the nominal home of Euelpides (line 645).
- Dodona: An ancient, oracular shrine in the north west of Greece, its role is now performed by the birds (line 716).
- Hebrus: A large river north of Greece favoured by swans (line 774).
- Sparta: Home town of the enemy, it is also the name for common rope used as webbing for beds. Euelpides thinks it might be a good name for the new city-in-the-sky but Pisthetaerus would never sleep comfortably under that name (line 815). More commonly known as Lacedaimon, Sparta is the model of a xenophobic town (1012).
- Phlegra: A plain where the Olympian gods outboasted the giants (line 824).
- Pelasgicon: The northern side of the Athenian acropolis, its equivalent in Cloudcuckooland is called Pelargikon – of the stork (line 832).
- Sounion: A promontory identified with Poseidon Souniaratos (Invoked at Sounion), it is now to be identified with the hawk – Sounierax (line 868). The epithet Souniaratos appears also in The Knights.
- Ortygia: An island identified with Leto Ortygometra (Mother of Quail Island), it is now to be identified with the quail though by the same epithet Ortygometra (line 870).
- Aetna: A Sicilian city founded by the Greek tyrant Hieron I, it is fancifully mentioned by the young poet (line 926) while he addresses Pisthetaerus in the manner of the illustrious bard Pindar addressing Hieron (Pindar fragment 94).
- Corinth and Sicyon: Neighbouring towns in the northern Peloponnese, they are used metaphorically in a prophecy quoted by the oracle monger to define an intermediate space inhabited by dogs and crows i.e. Cloudcuckooland (line 968).
- Colonus: A deme within the Aegides tribe, close to Athens – the mathematician Meton had recently designed an aqueduct there.
- Olophyxia: A remote town in the troubled north-east of Greece, near Mount Athos, it is the very model of a well-regulated town (line 1041).
- Laurium: A mining district near Athens, famous for its silver – owls from there (i.e. Athenian coins) will flock to the festival judges who award victory to The Birds (line 1106).
- Alpheus: A river associated with Olympia, home of The Olympic Games – a breathless, gasping runner is said to be breathing it (line 1121).
- Thrace: A north-eastern frontier and often a battleground during the Peloponnesian War, it is where the rebellious youth is sent to act out his violent instincts (line 1369). It is mentioned in other plays.
- Pellene: A village in the northern Peloponnese where a woollen cloak was awarded to winners in local games. It is mentioned also in Lysistrata.
- Corcyra: A supply port for the Sicilian Expedition, it is mentioned here as a source of good cords for whips – the only 'wings' that Psithetaerus will give the sycophant (line 1463).

Foreigners

- Medes: Brothers of the Persians, one might be expected to arrive on a camel – even if he happened to be a bird (line 277). There are several references to them in the other plays.
- Carians: Inhabiting the eastern shores of the Aegean, they are known for their involvement with crests – they invented the helmet crest and they lived on hill crests (line 292) – see also Herodotus. An Athenian named Execestides is mentioned twice on account of his Carian origins (765, 1527). There are references to Carians in two other plays.
- Persians: A delegate from Persia, Pharnaces, is scheduled to appear at the ecclesia – an opportunity for corrupt Athenian officials (line 1030). Other references to Persians are in terms of the cock, a Persian bird (lines 485, 707) that predated Darius and Megabazus (484) as lord of Persia. Persians are mentioned in other plays too.
- Chians: Staunch allies of the Athenians, they merit a mention in prayers (line 879). There are references to them in other plays also.
- Scythians: A warlike and savage people – an effete Athenian, Straton, is imagined wandering in their midst (941). Scythians feature in the role of archers (Athenian equivalent of policemen) in three plays.

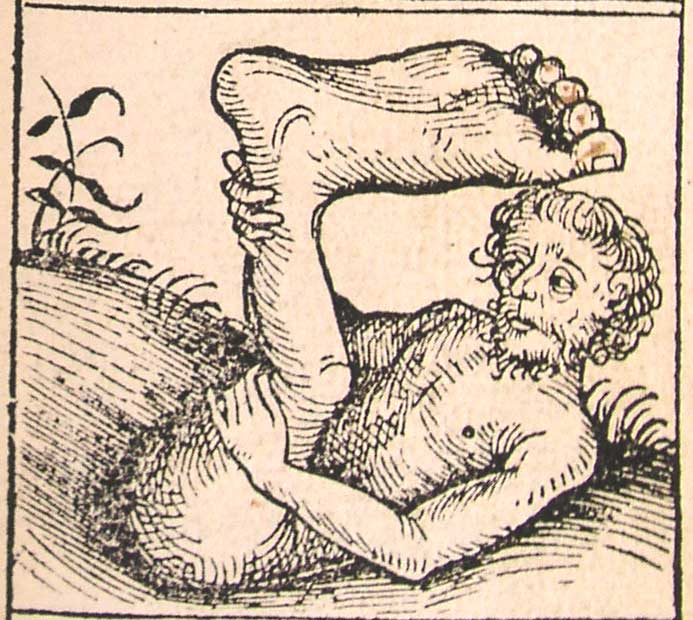
The Shadow Foots (Skiapodes): a mythical people, they are mentioned in The Birds only as the neighbours of a spooky Socrates (line 1553)

- Thales: One of the sages of ancient Greece, he is a benchmark for other mathematically minded intellectuals (line 1009).
- Sardanapalus: An Assyrian king, he is the benchmark for other extravagant and self-indulgent imperialists (line 1021).
- Lydians: Formerly an imperial power, they and their neighbours the Phrygians are now such timid folk that even the rainbow goddess Iris could intimidate them (line 1244). The Lydians are mentioned also in The Clouds.
- Illyrians: A barbarous people remarkable for the savagery of their warcries – barbarian gods sound like them when attacking Zeus (line 1521).
- Triballians: A people inhabiting the Thracian frontier – one of their gods is in the delegation to Cloudcuckooland.

Poets, artists and intellectuals

- Acestor Sacas: A foreign-born tragic poet – he is drawn to Athens just as Pisthetaerus is repelled by it (line 31). He is mentioned also in The Wasps.
- Sophocles: A renowned tragic poet, he wrote a play Tereus that is the basis for The Hoopoe's unfortunate appearance (line 100). He receives mentions in other plays also.
- Melanthius: A rather tragic tragic poet – mocked here for his leprous-like skin (line 151) and in Peace for his gluttony and lack of talent.
- Philocles: A nephew of the great tragedian, Aeschylus, he wrote a play about Tereus that was a feeble descendant of the Tereus written by Sophocles and he is nicknamed 'Lark' (lines 281, 1295). He is mocked in another two plays.
- Aesop: The legendary author of fables – the birds are ignorant because they have never read him (line 471) and he is the author of a cautionary tale about the eagle and the fox (651). There are references to him in The Wasps and Peace.
- Homer: The great Bard – he is indirectly quoted describing Hera (Iris) as a timid dove (line 575) and poets as servants of the Muses (910). He is referred to by name in three other plays.
- Prodicus: A philosopher and pundit, his knowledge is not respected by the birds (line 692). He is named also in The Clouds.
- Phrynichus (tragic poet): A respected tragic poet, he collected songs from the woodland Muse like a bee (line 749). He is mentioned in other plays.
- Aeschylus: A renowned tragic poet, he is named by Pisthetaerus as the author of a verse about heroes being shot with their own arrows/feathers (line 808) – the verse was borrowed from the now lost play Myrmidons. Moreover, a description of the nightingale (677) and Iris's threats of divine wrath (1240) are borrowed from Agamemnon, and Pisthetaerus' counter-threat to burn down Zeus's house (1246–7) appears to have been borrowed from Niobe.
- Chairis: A musician ridiculed in two other plays as a source of unwelcome noise, he adds to the cacophony of the birds in this play (line 857).
- Simonides: A respected poet, he is a role-model for the opportunistic young versifier who hopes to be hired by Cloudcuckooland (line 919). Simonides is accused of greediness in Peace, and he is twice mentioned in The Clouds.
- Pindar: A renowned poet, he is referred to by name (line 939) and his elevated style is plagiarized by the young versifier (see remarks for Hieron I above). Some of his verses are also quoted in The Knights and The Clouds.
- Euripides: A controversial tragic poet, he is lampooned in all Aristophanes' plays and he even features as a character in three of them (The Acharnians, Thesmophoriazusae and The Frogs). There is no direct mention of him in this play but there are quotations from some of his plays: a derogatory reference to Lydians and Phrygians (line 1244) is from Alcestis and a Choral injunction to make way for the hero (1720) is from The Trojan Women.
- Socrates: A famously quixotic philosopher, he was the role model for a generation of hungry, unkempt men until Pisthetaerus inspired new hope (line 1282). He is said to be an unwashed guide to the Underworld and a neighbour of the weird Shadow Foot people (Skiapodes line 1555). He appears as a character in The Clouds and he is mentioned again in The Frogs.
- Chaerephon: A loyal disciple of Socrates, he is a bat from hell in this play (lines 1296 and 1564). He is mentioned several times in The Clouds and a couple of times in The Wasps.
- Cinesias: An innovative poet, he was often ridiculed by comic poets. He is a ridiculous, minor character in this play, where he is presented as a hyperbolical rhapsodist. He receives other mentions in The Frogs and Ecclesiaszusae.
- Gorgias: A renowned orator from Sicily – he and his student (or son) Philippus are barbarous monstrosities disfigured by their versatile tongues (line 1701). Both orators are mention also in The Wasps.

Athenian politicians and generals

- Aristocrates, son of Scellias: A political and military figure, his name allows for a pun on aristocracy – he is despised by Euelpides.
- Nicias: One of the leading generals in Athens, recently entrusted with command of the Sicilian Expedition – he is a benchmark for clever soldiering (line 363) and for procrastination (640). He plays a minor role as a slave in The Knights and he is also mentioned by name in that play.
- Lusicrates: A snub-nosed official, notorious for taking bribes (line 513). He is possibly the same Lusicrates mentioned in Ecclesiazusae.
- Diitrephes: One of two cavalry commanders at that time, he was also a manufacturer of wicker jackets for wine jars, with handles known as 'wings' – these wings have helped him to rise to positions of authority (798) and he inspires youths to join the cavalry (1442).
- Theogenes: A prominent politician, formerly a colleague of Cleon in a fact-finding mission to Pylos and one of seventeen Athenians pledged to observe the Peace of Nicias, it is possible that he was also influential three years later in the Oligarchic Coup of 411 BC and in the Tyranny of The Thirty. He is ridiculed here as a braggart (lines 822, 1127, 1295). He is mentioned in another three plays.
- Aeschines: Possibly an influential figure many years later in Tyranny of The Thirty, he is here ridiculed as a braggart (line 823). He is mentioned also in The Wasps.
- Teleas: An influential politician – he is someone who doesn't like flighty types of people (line 168) and he is said to have been the man responsible for sending the inspector to Cloudcuckooland (1025)
- Peisander: Represented as a ghastly soldier in Peace and a corrupt rabble-rouser in Lysistrata, he is mentioned here as a soulless, bloodthirsty Odysseus-like figure (line 1556).
- Laespodias: Another general, he was notable for a deformity of his legs, though he tried to hide it under his cloak (line 1569).

Athenian personalities

- Philocrates: A prominent figure in the bird market (lines 14, 1077).
- Callias: A spendthrift, he had squandered his inheritance paying off sycophants and loose women – he resembles a bird moulting (lines 283-4). He is mentioned again in two later plays.
- Cleonymus: Constantly the butt of Aristophanic jokes for gluttony and cowardice, he is compared here with a 'Gobbler' bird that has a crest (line 289) and to a tree that drops leaves like shields (1475).
- Orestes: Identified as a drunken and violent loiterer in The Acharnians, he has since then added clothes-stealing to his bag of tricks (lines 712, 1490)
- Cleisthenes: A frequent target for jokes on account of his conspicuous effeminacy, he appears as a minor character in The Acharnians and in Thesmophoriazusae. He is a good reason why a virago like Athena should not be patron goddess of Cloudcuckooland i.e. one gender-bender is enough (line 831).
- Straton: Yet another effete Athenian mentioned in other plays, he is imagined suffering privations among savage Scythians (line 942).
- Proxenides: Another braggart like Theogenes (see above) – the walls of Cloudcuckooland are so broad that they could ride past each other on large chariots (line 1126). Proxenides is mentioned earlier in The Wasps.
- Athenians who resemble birds: Tharreleides: jackdaw (line 17); Sporgilus the barber: sparrow (300); Spintharus, Athenian of Phrygian descent: finch (762); Son of Peisias, a traitor: partridge (766); Menippus: swallow; Lycurgus: ibis; Syracosius: jay; Meidias: quail Cleocritus, mentioned also in The Frogs: ostrich.
- Extras: Patrocleides: known for an act of incontinence (790); Leotrophides: a client worthy of the poet Cinesias (1406).

Historic, religious and mythical figures

- Cranaus: A mythological king of Athens, his name is used as an epithet for Athenians (line 123). There are similar mentions in two other plays.
- Itys: The tragically short-lived son of Tereus and Procne, his name is used by the hoopoe when summoning the nightingale (line 212).
- Agamemnon, Menelaus, Priam: Legendary kings of Greece and Troy – birds were prominently featured on their royal insignia (lines 509,512). Only Menelaus is named in other plays.
- Cebriones, Porphyrion: Two of the giants who featured in the Gigantomachy, they are emblematic of the birds' revolt against the Olympian order (lines 553, 1249–52)
- Alcmene, Semele, Alope: Nymphs who were visited by the Olympian gods, they are typical of the old days when the Olympians had free passage through the skies (lines 558-9). Alcmene is mentioned also in The Frogs, Semele in Thesmophoriazusae.
- Erebus, Tartarus, Eros: Foundational material for genealogies such as Hesiod's Theogony, they are here revealed to be close relatives of the birds. Erebus (lines 691, 1194) isn't mentioned in other plays. Tartarus (693, 698) is mentioned in The Clouds, and Eros (700, 1737) in two other plays.
- Colainis: An epithet for Artemis; it allows for a weak pun with acalanthis, the Attic word for goldfinch (lines 875).
- Sabazius: A Phrygian god – his ethnic origin allows for a pun with phrygilos, the Attic word for finch (line 876). He is named in two other plays.
- Cybele: Known also as the 'mountain mother' (line 746), she is here identified with the ostrich and subsequently invoked as mother of the ostrich-like Cleocritus (877).
- Bacis: A legendary soothsayer – his oracles are lampooned in this play (lines 962, 970) and in other plays.
- Pandora: The mythical source of mankind's misfortunes, she is to be placated with the sacrifice of a white ram on the authority of Bacis (line 971).
- Diopeithes: A contemporary Athenian soothsayer and religious fanatic mentioned in other plays, he is mentioned here along with the like-minded Lampon (line 988). Lampon is mentioned also as somebody who swears 'by the goose' (521).
- Alexander: The legendary prince of Troy – the festival judges can expect better gifts than he ever got if they award first place to The Birds (line 1104).
- Timon: The legendary misanthrope – what he was to the Athenians, Prometheus is to the Olympians (line 1549). He is mentioned also in Lysistrata.
- Odysseus: The hero of Homer's epic, named in three other plays – he is presented here as a benchmark for spooky bloodlust (line 1561).
- Solon: The founding father of Athenian democracy – his laws even govern the behaviour of the gods (line 1660).

== Discussion ==
It has been argued that The Birds has suffered more than any other Aristophanic play from over-interpretation by scholars. Political allegory featured prominently in 19th century interpretations: Cloudcuckooland could be identified with the Sicilian Expedition as an over-ambitious scheme, Athenians could then be identified with the birds, and their enemies with the Olympian gods. The 20th century has also come up with allegorical interpretations—for example, Pisthetaerus has been interpreted as a metaphor for Alcibiades. Cloudcuckooland has been understood by some scholars as a comic representation of an ideal polis and it has also been understood as a cautionary example of a polis gone wrong; according to yet another view, however, the play is nothing more than escapist entertainment.

The friendship between Pisthetaerus and Euelpides is realistically portrayed in spite of the unreality of their adventure. The keynote of their friendship is good-humoured teasing of each other for one another's failings (e.g. lines 54–5, 86–91, 336–42, 800–802) and the proof of their friendship is the ease with which they work together in difficult situations, largely due to Euelpides' willingness to concede the initiative and leadership to Pisthetaerus. The father-son relationship between Philocleon and Bdelycleon in The Wasps and the husband-wife relationship between Cinesias and Myrrine in Lysistrata are other examples of Aristophanes' ability to depict humanity convincingly in the most unconvincing settings imaginable.

Toynbee, in his Study of History, argues for a link between The Birds and the New Testament, pointing out significant examples of correspondence:

- Both Pisthetaerus and Jesus are deified human beings.
- Cloudcuckooland is synonymous with the Kingdom of Heaven, as they are both idealized heavenly cities.
- The example given in Matthew 6:26 of birds that make their living without reaping or gathering is echoed from a conversation between Euelpides and Hoopoe, in lines 155–61. Another connection is a fragment of Musonius.
- The Christian imagery of the Dove as the Holy Spirit is derived from its use as the emblem of the "heavenly love" of Aphrodite Urania.

He believes that the New Testament was influenced by a literary tradition that began with Aristophanes. The major difference is that Aristophanes presents these ideas as comic fantasy, while the New Testament treats them as profoundly serious revelation.

== The Birds and Old Comedy ==
The Birds resembles all the early plays of Aristophanes in key aspects of its dramatic structure. Such resemblances are evidence of a genre of ancient drama known as Old Comedy. Variations from these 'conventions' are significant since they demonstrate either a trend away from Old Comedy, a corruption in the text or a unique dramatic effect that the author intended. Variations in this play are found in the following conventions:

- Agon: The agon is a debate or formal argument constructed as a 'symmetrical scene', with two declaimed sections and two songs. The protagonist generally defeats the antagonist in the debate and this decides the outcome of the play long before the play actually ends. The agon in The Birds (lines 451–626) is conventional in form but there is no antagonist – the two main speakers are Pisthetaerus and his friend Euelpides, with Pisthetaerus delivering a speech and Euelpides providing supportive comments. The birds provide a willing audience and they are easily won over to the protagonist's point of view. A similarly one-sided agon is found in the next surviving play, Lysistrata.
- Parabasis: The parabasis is an address to the audience by the Chorus in the absence of any actors. Generally there is a long parabasis in the middle of the play, including a 'parabasis proper' in which the Chorus speaks as the author's representative on issues relating to his career, and usually there is a shorter parabasis near the end. In this play, the first parabasis (678–800) and the second (1058–1117) are conventional in structure but the Chorus always speaks in character as birds. Instead of speaking about the poet in the 'parabasis proper', the birds speak about themselves, outlining their genealogy, their value to the audience and their effect on the audience's vocabulary – in all these topics however there are amusing echoes of things a Chorus would ordinarily say on behalf of the poet. This 'parabasis proper' is in fact almost a satire on the convention of a parabasis proper.
- Unwelcome Visitors: The protagonist's early victory in the agon generally tends to ease dramatic tension early in the play and this is usually offset to some extent by a stream of minor characters or 'unwelcome visitors' that have to be chased off by the triumphant hero. This play is exceptional in that there are three waves of unwelcome visitors – the first wave comes before the walls of Cloudcuckooland have been completed, the second wave comes immediately after and the third wave comes as a delegation from Zeus. This repetition is the reason why The Birds is much longer than the other surviving plays.

== Performances ==
- 1982: King's College Classical Society, original Greek; performance commemorated at a King's College website.
- 1983: Greek Theatre of New York, based on a translation by Walter Kerr with songs and lyrics by Evangelos Fampas and John Neil Harris; reviewed in The New York Times.
- 1997: Theatre of N.O.T.E. in Los Angeles presented Ken Roht's 1997 musical adaptation and production.
- 2011: Ramapo College presented an original modern adaptation and production.
- 2012: Newark Academy presented Walter Kerr's translation.
- 2013: Susquehanna University presented a modern adaptation.
- 2014: Blessed Trinity Catholic High School presented a modern adaptation.
- 2015: Humboldt State University presented a modern adaptation.
- 2015: Dalhousie University presented a modern adaption in a verse version by Sean O'Brien.
- 2015: St Vincent's College, Potts Point presented a modern adaptation.
- 2015: St. Viator High School presented a modern adaptation.
- 2016: Iowa State University presented a modern adaption by Amanda Petefisch-Schrag and Ben Schrag
- 2017: Indiana University of Pennsylvania presented a modern adaptation by Steven J. York and Ola Kraszplulska, performed by Footlight Players.
- 2017: New York University Drama Therapy Program in conjunction with Residents of Hebrew Home
- 2017: University of Missouri–St. Louis presented a modern day and comedic adaptation by Jamie Walker
- 2025: University of Toronto Mississauga presented a modern version Directed by Marcel Stewart, adaptation by Yvette Nolan

== Translations ==
- Tasos Apostolides and George Akokolides, The Comedies of Aristophanes in Comics - Birds, Komos, Athens, 2015, ISBN 978-960-7738-25-7
- Jeffrey Henderson, 2002 – verse
- John Hookham Frere, 1839 – verse
- William James Hickie, 1853 – prose, full text
- Benjamin B. Rogers, 1924 – verse
- Arthur S. Way, 1934 – verse
- Eugene O'Neill, Jr, 1938 – prose: full text
- Wilfrid Oldaker, Scenes from the Birds of Aristophanes, with Introduction, Notes, Vocabulary, and Appendices (Cambridge University Press, 1953)
- Dudley Fitts, 1957 – prose and verse
- William Arrowsmith, 1962 – verse
- David Barrett, 1978: available for digital loan
- Alan H. Sommerstein, 1987 – prose
- Nan Dunbar, 1995
- Stephen Halliwell, 1997 — verse
- Ken Roht, 1997 musical adaptation
- Peter Meineck, 1998 – prose
- George Theodoridis, 2002 – prose: full text
- Ian C. Johnston, 2008 – verse: full text
- "The Birds". The Online Books Page.
- Claudia Haas and Richard Cash – play: sample text
- Don Zolidis – prose (modern adaptation): sample text
- Robert H. Webb: available for digital loan
- Paul Roche, 2005 - verse
