= Diodotus =

Diodotus may refer to:

- Diodotus I, Seleucid satrap of Bactria
- Diodotus II, Greco-Bactrian king, son of Diodotus I
- Diodotus Tryphon, king of the Hellenistic Seleucid kingdom 142–138 BC
- Diodotus the Stoic, stoic philosopher, and friend of Cicero
- Diodotus the grammarian, who according to Diogenes Laërtius wrote a commentary on the works of Heraclitus.
- Diodotus (son of Eucrates), ancient Athenian who opposed Cleon's proposal in 427 BC to kill all adult Mytilenean males and to enslave their women and children after the Mytilenean revolt
