= Mytilenean Debate =

Assembly of the Peloponnesian War, 427 BCE

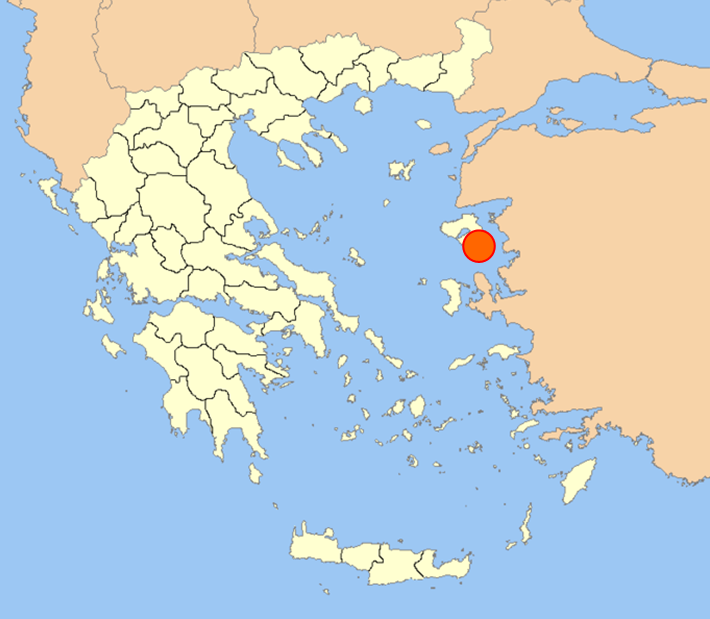
Location of Mytilene on the island of Lesbos

The Mytilenean Debate or Mytilenaean Debate was an Athenian Assembly concerning reprisals against the city-state of Mytilene, which had attempted unsuccessfully to revolt against Athenian hegemony and gain control over Lesbos during the Peloponnesian War. The debate occurred in 427 BC. In the immediate aftermath of the revolt, the Athenians had decided to execute all Mytilenean men and enslave the women and children, but gathered the next day to reconsider. Thucydides reports the revolt and the resultant debate in book three of his History of the Peloponnesian War, and the opposing viewpoints concerning the warranted retributive justice are reflected in two speeches given by prominent Athenians. The events and speeches serve as an opportunity to explore the political and ideological impact of the war, and provide reflections on democracy and imperial policy.

== Causes for the revolt ==
Mytilene had joined in alliance with Athens as a member of the Delian League, which began as a voluntary coalition of Greek city-states against Persia, during the Greco-Persian Wars. Most members of the Delian League had been effectively reduced to tributary status under Athenian hegemony, in which member states paid dues in cash, which were then used to supplement the Athenian fleet of warships. Mytilene was one of the last non-tributary members of the Delian League which sent its own warships manned with Mytileneans to fight alongside the Athenian fleet. Mytilene was also distinguished from other Athenian allies because it was ruled by an oligarchy, not a democracy.

Mytilene had sought to end its alliance with Athens prior to the outbreak of the Peloponnesian War, and appealed to Sparta for support, but this appeal was rejected. The Mytileneans took advantage of the hostility between Sparta and Athens as the Pelopponesian War broke out to seek assistance from the Spartans once more in resisting Athenian rule. The Mytileneans sent an envoy to Olympia in 428 BC, whose speech given to the Spartans was recorded by Thucydides, and explains the reasons for the Mytilenean revolt against the Athenians.

Athens and its allies in the Delian League (shown in yellow)

According to the envoy, the Mytileneans feared tributary democracy and did not want to be reduced to the status of other Athenian allies. The Mytileneans believed that Athens had taken advantage of the Delian League and used it as a mechanism for "enslaving" and exploiting other Greeks; that it was only a matter of time before they set their sights on Mytilene's prosperous and autonomous island of Lesbos and forced it into their system of oppression; and that the Mytileneans could not wait for this and should preemptively break away before Athens forced its will upon them.

This speech does not, however, reflect the motivations which drove the oligarchs to rebellion. According to the informants who supplied the Athenians with intelligence concerning preparations for the revolt, the Mytilenean oligarchs sought to forcibly unify the five city-states of Lesbos under their sovereign leadership. Athenian policy aimed to break up larger units within the confederacy and did not support consolidation of Mytilenean power.

== The Mytilenean revolt ==
The Mytileneans, with the support of the oligarchic Lesbian city-states of Antissa, Eresus, and Pyrrha, began preparing for the revolt during the Summer of 428. They began building moles for their harbors, erecting fortifications, and building additional warships. They had also sent for archers and grain from the Pontus. Athens was informed of these preparations by inhabitants of the nearby island of Tenedos; by members of democratic Methymna, the only city-state on the island of Lesbos which did not revolt against Athens nor support a unified Lesbos under Mytilene; and by those dissident Mytileneans who were proxenoi of Athens. Proxenoi were a small faction of political opponents, whose temperaments were compatible with Athenian democracy. Athens selected these officials to strengthen her position internally and prepare for the eventual removal of the oligarchies.

The Athenians responded to the news by sending an embassy to persuade the Mytileneans to give up their preparations, and when this effort failed, they sent a fleet of ships to the island of Lesbos. The Athenians planned to surprise the Mytileneans during the celebration of an upcoming festival in honor of the Malean Apollo. The Mytileneans, however, were informed of the Athenian expedition and did not engage in festivities; instead, they barricaded and guarded the island. Upon arrival, Athens delivered an ultimatum, which ordered the Mytileneans to surrender and tear down their fortifications, but they refused and the rebellion ensued. However, due to the intelligence given to Athens by the informants, the Mytileneans were forced into revolt before they were militarily prepared. As a result, the Mytileneans quickly retreated and had to implement negotiating tactics to stall for time. After the Mytileneans and Athenians reached an armistice, the Mytileneans sent representatives to Athens for negotiations. With little hope that the Athenians would recall the fleet, the Mytileneans also secretly sent envoys to Sparta. The Mytilenean representatives called for the removal of the Athenian fleet, which the Athenians promptly denied, and fighting continued. All of Lesbos, other than Methymna, took arms against Athens, but Lesbos lost ground upon the arrival of more Athenian troops. Mytilene became surrounded by Athenian fortifications and were isolated by land and sea. In Olympia, the Mytileneans asked the Spartans for direct help in Mytilene, but also for an invasion of Attica, pointing out that since Athens had recently been devastated by a plague it would have financial difficulties fighting on two fronts. The Peloponnesian League agreed to aid Mytilene.

During the winter, Sparta sent Salatheus to deliver an announcement to the Mytileneans. He arrived in Mytilene undetected by the Athenians. He assured the Mytileneans that the Peloponnesians planned to invade Attica, in order to distract the Athenians from attacking a fleet of forty ships sent by the Spartans. He promised the ships would soon arrive with supplies. The arrival of this news encouraged the Mytilenenas to reject any ideas of negotiating with the Athenians. As promised, Attica was invaded, but the Peloponnesians were forced to retreat due to lack of provisions, and the fleet sent to Mytilene took too long on its journey.

Salaethus gave up hope that the fleet would arrive and armed the Mytilenean people in a final effort to launch a defensive attack against the Athenians. The people soon refused to follow orders, however, and demanded that the oligarchs bring all the reserves of food to the public or else they would surrender. The oligarchs could not meet these demands and agreed to join the people in surrendering Mytilene to Paches and his troops. The Mytileneans arranged for terms of capitulation; the Athenians were admitted into Mytilene as long as the Mytileneans were allowed to send an embassy to Athens to plead for compassion, and Paches agreed that no punitive actions would be taken until the Athenians agreed upon a conclusion. After finding Salaethus in hiding, Paches sent him, along with those most prominent in drafting the terms of negotiation and leading the revolt, to Athens.

== Debate ==
Once the Mytileneans sent by Paches arrived in Athens, Salaethus was immediately executed, and the assembly gathered to deliberate what punitive actions should be taken. The Athenians were furious that the Mytileneans, who had enjoyed the privilege of non-tributary status, had not only revolted against their allies but sought the support from the Peloponnesian enemies. This latter action, in the eyes of the Athenians, also served as proof that the rebellion had been long premeditated. It was within the context of this reactionary anger that the Assembly that same day voted to sentence all of the male Mytilenean citizens to death, while the women and children would be sold into slavery. A trireme was dispatched to Mytilene so that Paches could receive and carry out the decree.

The next day, the Athenians reflected upon the brutality of their actions and questioned the merit of a decree which executed the whole population for the crimes of the few. The Mytilenean ambassadors at Athens pushed for a second vote, and an assembly was called in order to reassess the course of action to be taken. The debate as presented by Thucydides is framed as a series of two speeches which represent the two opposing sides of the debate.

=== Cleon's speech ===
The first speech was given by Cleon. Cleon, who carried the reputation as "the most violent man at Athens," spoke to defend the previous decision against any doubts with had arisen. Cleon began his speech by questioning the compatibility of democratic and imperial goals, asserting that "a democracy is incapable of empire," and that the reconsideration of the first decision regarding the fate of the Mytileneans is further evidence of this incapability. He argued that the "constant change of measures" was a threat to the stability of the empire, and that "bad laws which are never changed are better for a city than good ones that have no authority." Cleon then critiqued of one of the fundamental elements of Athenian democracy: the contests of "elaborate sophistic arguments." He placed the blame upon all Athenians for instituting this process of argumentation, who he called "victims of newfangled arguments" and "slaves to the pleasure of the ear." He believed that these contests were a distraction which caused a delay that only benefited the guilty.

Cleon then sought to prevent this distraction by asserting the guilt of the Mytileneans. According to Cleon, because Mytilene was not oppressed by Athens but rather an independent city-state with its own fleet and fortifications, their uprising was not a revolt but a "deliberate and wanton aggression; an attempt to ruin [Athens] by siding with our bitterest enemies; a worse offense than war undertaken on their own account in the acquisition of power." He argued that it was this distinguished status of Mytilene over the other allies of Athens which made them arrogant and predisposed to rebellion. He urged the Athenians to impose the same punishment on all Mytileneans, not just the aristocracy, because the people were complacent in the plans of the aristocracy and because failing to do so would encourage revolt among other allies of the Athenians. His speech concludes by urging the Athenians to channel their initial anger towards the Mytileneans in order to pay them back for their malicious actions and intentions.

=== Diodotus's speech ===
After Cleon's speech, Diodotus spoke in defense of his sustained opposition to the death sentence. The structure of his speech responded to that of Cleon, as Diodotus began by arguing that "the two things most opposed to good counsel are haste and passion," and defended the process of debating important questions. Instead of challenging Cleon's assertion of the guilt of the Mytileneans, however, Diodotus argued that it was not their guilt which was the matter of importance, but instead the interest of Athens. Even if the Mytileneans were guilty, according to Diodotus, they should only have been put to death if the penalty was expedient for the future of Athens. He urged the Athenians to remember that they were "not in a court of justice" and therefore Cleon's argument, while it may have seemed more just, was not appropriate for the setting.

Diodotus then argued that there is no law or punishment that can prevent states or individuals from rebelling. He proposed two options; either the Athenians must employ "some means of terror more terrible" than the death penalty or recognize its ineffectiveness. With the argument that rebellion is impossible to prevent, even with the death penalty, Diodotus rejected Cleon's appeal to set a precedent with the punishment of the Mytileneans. Diodotus then proceeded to consider how sparing the people of Mytilene would be most expedient for the future of Athens. He argued that, by imposing the same punishment upon all Mytileneans, rebels would be shown there was no point in repenting or surrendering. This was concerning to the future of Athens, according to Diodotus, because subjected states were an important source of revenue. If they knew there was no mercy shown, no matter when they surrendered, they would fight until the city was in ruins. Athens would then be left with no tribute and no strength to fight against their common enemies in the Peloponnesian League. This moderate approach, therefore, was not one based on justice, but rather on the benefit of preserving the revenue from tributary allies. Diodotus concluded his speech by imploring the Athenians to consider the most useful approach for preserving the Athenian Empire; that is, calmly trying the prisoners sent by Paches and leaving the rest of the Mytileneans alone.

== Results of the debate ==
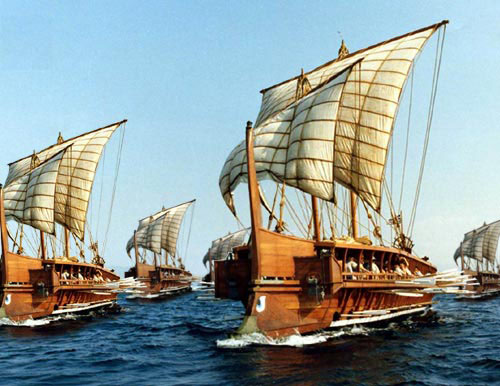
Both ships sent to deliver the first and second decree to Paches in Mytilene were triremes. A fleet of triremes is pictured above.

With the conclusion of Diodotus' speech, the assembly recast their votes. The rational argument of expediency developed by Diodotus prevailed and the assembly was persuaded to not massacre the Mytileneans. As a result, the votes, which were originally unanimous, were narrowly passed in favor of Diodotus.

Another trireme, double-manned to row overnight and provisioned by the Mytilenean ambassadors, was immediately sent to Lesbos in order to prevent the previous orders from being carried out. Favorable weather and diligence of the rowers ensured that the second trireme arrived just in time; Paches had only just read the decree brought by the first trireme but had not yet carried out the sentence. The massacre was prevented and the people of Mytilene were spared. The architects of the rebellion, who had been sent to Athens by Paches, were put to death by the Athenians. The Athenians demolished the city walls of Mytilene, seized their ships, and divided their land into allotments which were distributed amongst Athenian shareholders.

The debate as recorded by Thucydides provides important insight into Athenian democracy and imperial policy, and reflections upon their development and role in the Peloponnesian War. Cleon's speech reflects the critiques of Athenian democracy which would continue to develop and be employed against Athens by its enemies. These critiques also provide an opportunity for Diodotus to defend the centrality of rhetoric and sophist discourse within the Athenian Assembly and elevate the importance of orators as political figures. The argument developed by Diodotus further serves to distinguish the role of the Assembly as one that is political and not concerned with justice; this distinction would continue to develop within the context of Athenian democracy.

The discussions of expediency and the future of the Athenian Empire in the debate likewise reflect the more general pattern of Athenian imperial policy developed throughout the Peloponnesian War. The importance of Mytilene, and all of the other allies in the Delian League, as a source of revenue for Athens to exploit in order to maintain its fleet is clear in the argument given by Diodotus and reflective of the imperial strategy developed by Pericles that emphasized the importance of the tributary relationship. This imperial policy would develop after the death of Pericles with Cleon, and the more aggressive and offensive approach that he would take is reflected in his argument for punishing all of the people of Mytilene.

The results of the Mytilenean Debate may be contrasted with the later Melian Dialogue—where Athens killed all the men and sold the women and children into slavery. This difference in outcomes serves as one example of how the treatment of Athens' allies in the Delian League would develop as the Peloponnesian War progressed.

== See also ==
- Peloponnesian War
- Delian League
- Melian dialogue
