= Mytilenean revolt =

Incident during the Peloponnesian War (428–427 BC)

Mytilenean Revolt
- Part of the Peloponnesian War
Date	428–427 BC
Location	Lesbos
Result	Athenian victory

Belligerents
Athens; Methymna; Tenedos	Mytilene; Sparta

Commanders and leaders
Paches	Salaithos; Alkidas
- The suppression of the revolt in 427 BC was followed by a famous debate at Athens in which the assembly ordered the execution of the entire male population of Mytilene, but then reversed that order a day later.

The Mytilenean revolt was an incident in the Peloponnesian War in which the city of Mytilene attempted to unify the island of Lesbos under its control and revolt from the Athenian Empire. In 428 BC, the Mytilenean government planned a rebellion in concert with Sparta, Boeotia, and certain other cities on the island, and began preparing to revolt by fortifying the city and laying in supplies for a prolonged war. These preparations were interrupted by the Athenian fleet, which had been notified of the plot, and the Mytileneans sent representatives to Athens to discuss a settlement, but simultaneously dispatched a secret embassy to Sparta to request support.

The attempt to reach a settlement at Athens fell through, as the Athenians were unwilling to allow their loyal ally Methymna to be subjugated by the Mytileneans, and the Athenian fleet blockaded Mytilene by sea. Sparta, although it agreed to send support and prepared a fleet, was cowed by an Athenian show of force and took no action at this time. On Lesbos, meanwhile, the arrival of 1,000 Athenian hoplites allowed Athens to complete the investment of Mytilene by walling it in on land. Although Sparta finally dispatched a fleet in the summer of 427 BC, it advanced with such caution and so many delays that it arrived in the vicinity of Lesbos only in time to receive news of Mytilene's surrender.

In the wake of the Mytileneans' surrender, a heated debate took place at Athens over their fate. One faction, led by Cleon, advocated executing all of the men in the city and enslaving the women and children, while another faction (one spokesman was Diodotus) preferred more moderate treatment in which only men who had been identified as ringleaders would be executed. The Athenian assembly wavered; an order for mass execution was issued on the first day of debate but countermanded on the next. In the end, the city as a whole was spared, but 1,000 "ringleaders" (although this figure is viewed sceptically, and it is believed that due to a misreading by a scribe, the figure was actually closer to 30) were executed without trial.

== Plan and preparations ==
The Mytilenean government (which was oligarchic) had considered revolting from Athens even before the Peloponnesian War broke out, but when they initially approached Sparta in the 430s BC, the Spartans would not promise to accept them into the Peloponnesian League. Without the necessary Spartan support that would have made revolt feasible, the Mytileneans' plan came to nothing. In 428, however, the Mytilenean leaders judged that the time was ripe for revolt, and both Boeotia and Sparta participated in planning the rebellion. The primary motivation for the rebellion was the Mytilenean's desire to gain control of all of Lesbos; Athens generally discouraged the creation of multi-city subunits of the empire, and would certainly not have permitted Lesbos to be unified. Moreover, Mytilene's privileged status as an independent state, commanding its own fleet, within the Athenian empire seems to have given its leaders both confidence in their chances of success and concern that, if they did not revolt, they might in the future be reduced to the same tributary status as the majority of Athens' allies. The Mytileneans, therefore, began strengthening their fortifications and sent for mercenaries and supplies from the Black Sea region. Before they had completed their preparations, however, their plans were betrayed to the Athenians by several of their enemies in the region, namely the Methymnians and Tenedians, and by a group of Mytilenean citizens who represented Athens' interests in that city (probably members of the democratic faction there).

== Revolt ==
=== Initial moves ===
The Athenians, who were still suffering from the plague at this time and were under great financial strain from the unexpectedly long and involved war, initially tried to negotiate in order to avoid taking on yet another military commitment in Lesbos. When the Mytileneans refused to abandon their plans to unify Lesbos or their preparations for war, however, the Athenians resigned themselves to the necessity of a military response and dispatched a fleet to Mytilene; ten Mytilenean triremes which had been serving in the fleet were interned at Athens with their crews.

 The initial plan was for the fleet to arrive during a religious festival for which all the Mytileneans would be outside of the city, and during which it would be easy for the Athenians to seize the fortifications of the town.  Since this plan was crafted in the open Athenian assembly, however, it was impossible to keep it secret, and the Mytileneans had ample warning of the fleet's approach.[4]  On the day of the festival, they remained in the city, with doubled guards on the weaker sections of the walls; the Athenians, arriving to find the city well defended, ordered the Mytileneans to surrender their fleet and tear down their walls. The Mytileneans refused this demand, and even went so far as to send their fleet to fight the Athenians just outside the harbor. When the Athenians quickly defeated this fleet and drove it back into the harbor, however, the Mytileneans quickly agreed to negotiate, arranged an armistice on the scene, and sent representatives to Athens.  In doing this, however, the Mytilenean government was aiming not at reaching an accommodation with Athens, but rather at buying time for their negotiations with Sparta and Boeotia to bear fruit.[4] As the representatives were on their way to Athens, a second group was secretly dispatched to Sparta to secure that city's support in the rebellion.

=== Failure of negotiations and resumption of fighting ===
The negotiations at Athens were brief and unsuccessful. The Mytileneans offered to remain loyal if the Athenians would withdraw their fleet from Lesbos. Implicit in this proposition was that the Athenians would abandon Methymna, and that the Athenians could not do, as failing to protect a subject city from aggression would have undermined their claims to legitimacy as rulers of their empire. The Athenians, accordingly, rejected the Mytilenean offer, and when the ambassadors returned to Lesbos bearing this news all the cities of Lesbos save Methymna openly declared war on Athens. The Mytileneans mustered an army and marched out to attack the Athenian camp; although they came off slightly the better in the ensuing battle, they were unwilling to press their advantage and retreated back behind their fortifications before nightfall. At this point the Athenians, encouraged by the lack of initiative on their enemies' part, summoned troops from their allies and, once these arrived, built two fortified camps, one on either side of Mytilene's harbor. From these they instituted a naval blockade of the city (the Mytileneans and their allies continued to control all the land outside the Athenian fortifications).

=== Sparta wavers ===
Immediately after the Mytilenean attack on the Athenian camp, a trireme bearing ambassadors from Sparta and Boeotia slipped past the Athenians into Mytilene and persuaded the Mytileneans to send a second group of ambassadors to plead for Spartan intervention (the Spartans and Boeotians had been dispatched before the revolt, but had been prevented from entering the city for some time). This second group of Mytilenean ambassadors arrived within a week of the first, in July, but neither secured any immediate assistance; the Spartans deferred the decision over Mytilene to the Peloponnesian League as a whole, which would be convening at Olympia later that summer. At that meeting, the Mytilenean ambassadors gave a speech in which they gave justifications for their revolt, emphasized Athens' weakness, and stressed the importance of attacking the Athenians in the empire, from which they drew their resources. After hearing this speech, the Spartans and their allies voted to accept the Lesbians into their alliance and attack Athens immediately in support of the revolt.

The plans made at Olympia called for all the allied states to send their contingents to the isthmus of Corinth to join together and prepare to advance on Athens. The Spartan contingent was the first to arrive, and set about dragging ships across the isthmus from the gulf of Corinth so as to be able to attack simultaneously on land and sea. While the Spartans set enthusiastically about this work, however, the other allies sent in their contingents only slowly; the harvest was underway, and the allies were tired of constant military service (their service had already been called on that summer for a month-long invasion of Attica beginning in May). The Athenians, meanwhile, aware that the Peloponnesian's readiness to attack derived in part from the Mytileneans' assertions that Athens was critically weakened, prepared a fleet of 100 ships to raid the coast of the Peloponnese. Preparing the fleet required extreme measures, as the state's resources were already stretched thin; as not enough thetes (poor citizens) were available for service to crew the fleet fully, both zeugitai (landowners who usually fought as hoplites) and metics (resident aliens) were recruited to serve as rowers. The fleet raided at will along the Peloponnesian coast, and the Spartans, who had been promised that the forty ships at Mytilene and the forty that had circumnavigated the Peloponnese earlier in the summer were all the Athenians could muster, concluded that they had been deceived and called off their plans to launch an attack that summer.

=== Fighting on Lesbos ===
While the Spartan force was at the isthmus making its preparations, the Mytileneans and their allies launched an attack on Methymna, expecting that the city would be betrayed to them from within. In the event, however, the promised betrayal failed to materialize, and the attack was repulsed. The Mytileneans returned home, stopping along the way to help strengthen the fortifications of several of their allies near Methymna. Once the Mytileneans were gone, the Methymnians marched out against one of these cities, Antissa, and were defeated by the Antissans and their mercenaries in fighting outside that city's walls.

At this point the Athenians, realizing that their force at Lesbos was insufficient to cope with the Mytileneans, dispatched an additional 1,000 hoplites to the scene. The Athenians at Lesbos were now able to gain control of the land around Mytilene and build a wall of circumvallation around the city, completing the blockade of the city.

=== Siege, relief effort, and surrender ===
To pay the expenses of the ongoing siege in their current state of financial crisis, the Athenians were forced to turn to two extraordinary measures. First, they imposed an eisphora, or direct tax, on their own citizens. Ancient Greeks were extremely reluctant to use measures such as this, which were regarded as an imposition on personal freedom, and in fact this may have been the first time that such a tax was ever imposed at Athens. At the same time, Athens announced an increase in the tribute assessments for its subjects, and twelve ships were sent out to collect the new assessments several months before the usual time; this action clearly triggered resistance, as one of the generals commanding these ships was killed while attempting to make collections in Caria.

In the summer of 427 BC, the Spartans and their allies planned a concerted effort on land and sea to strain Athens' resources and relieve the siege at Mytilene. The annual invasion of Attica that year was the second largest of the Archidamian War, exceeded in duration and destructiveness only by that of 430. While this invasion was underway, 42 ships under the command of the navarch Alcidas were sent out to Mytilene; the plan was that the Athenians would be preoccupied with the invasion and unable to devote their full attention to Alcidas and his fleet.

At Mytilene, however, time was rapidly running out for the Peloponnesians to come to the rescue. A Spartan representative, Salaethus, had been smuggled into the city in a trireme at the end of the winter with news of the relief scheme, and had taken command of the defenses there in anticipation of the fleet's arrival. Food supplies in the city, however, were exhausted at some point early in the summer, and, since the fleet had yet to materialize, Salaethus was forced to gamble on a breakout attempt. Hoplite armor was issued to all the citizens, most of whom heretofore had only served as light troops, in preparation for this attempt. Once the people were thus armed, however, they refused to obey the government and demanded that the authorities distribute any remaining food supplies, threatening to come to terms with the Athenians on their own if this was not done. Realizing that they could not prevent this, and that a peace concluded without their involvement would surely be fatal to them, the members of the government contacted the Athenian commander and surrendered, on the condition that none of the Mytileneans should be imprisoned, enslaved, or executed until representatives from the city had presented their case at Athens.

While these events were taking place, Alcidas advanced slowly and cautiously with his fleet, wasting a great deal of time in rounding the Peloponnese. Although he succeeded in giving the Athenians the slip and reaching Delos without being discovered, he reached Erythrae on the coast of Ionia a few days later only to learn that Mytilene had already fallen. At this point the commander of the contingent from Elis advocated launching an attack on the Athenians at Mytilene, arguing that since they had only recently taken the city they would be off their guard and vulnerable to a surprise attack. Alcidas, however, was unwilling to attempt such a bold action, and also rejected a plan to seize some Ionian city as a base from which to foment rebellion in the empire. Indeed, once he learned of Mytilene's surrender Alcidas's primary goal was to return home without having to confront the Athenian fleet, and he accordingly began sailing southwards down the Ionian coast. Off Clarus he was spotted by the Athenian messenger ships Paralus and Salaminia, and the Athenian fleet set out from Mytilene to pursue him. Alcidas, however, set out from Ephesus in full flight back to the Peloponnese, neither landing nor stopping until he was safely home, and thus escaped his pursuers. After this, the Athenians returned to Lesbos and reduced the remaining rebellious cities there.

== Debate at Athens ==
After he completed subduing Mytilene, Paches sent the greater part of his army back to Athens, and sent with it the Mytileneans whom he had identified as particularly culpable in the revolt and the captured Spartan general Salaethus. Salaethus was executed immediately, although he suggested that, in return for his life, he would have the Spartan force besieging Plataea withdrawn. The assembly then turned its attention to the question of what to do with the prisoners at Athens and the rest of the Mytileneans back on Lesbos. What followed was one of the most famous debates in the history of the Athenian democracy, and one of only two occasions on which Thucydides records the content, and perhaps some of the actual words, of the opposing speeches in the assembly. As such, the debate has been the subject of much scholarly analysis, aimed elucidating both the circumstances of the revolt and the internal politics of Athens at that time.

=== Thucydides' account ===
The debate reported by Thucydides took place over two days. On the first day, the events of which Thucydides only summarizes, the Athenians angrily condemned the entire male population of Mytilene to death, and the women and children to slavery. The citizens were particularly enraged that the revolt had brought a Spartan fleet into Ionian waters, where it would never have passed in normal circumstances and where no enemy fleet had sailed in over 20 years. In accordance with the assembly's decision, a trireme was dispatched to Mytilene bearing orders for Paches to execute the Mytilenean men.

On the next day, however, as the Athenians considered the severity of the measure they had just passed, a number of citizens began to have second thoughts. Aware of this trend, the Mytilenean delegation that had been sent to Athens to present that city's case asked the prytanies to call a meeting of the assembly, and those officials acquiesced. At that meeting, a debate took place between those who supported the previous day's decree and those who called for a milder punishment. The first speech that Thucydides records was given by Cleon, who had proposed the previous day's motion. This speech marks Cleon's first appearance in the historical record, and Thucydides introduces him by saying that "he was remarkable among the Athenians for the violence of his character, and at this time he exercised far the greatest influence over the people."

In Cleon's speech, as reported by Thucydides, the politician argues that consistent enforcement of laws, even when they seem unjust, is the only way to maintaining order, and moreover that the Mytilenean people as a whole (not merely the aristocracy) had revolted against Athens, and thus deserved to be condemned. The speech is filled with acerbic criticism of the Athenian people, and of certain elements of the ideology of democracy, and it lays out an imperial ideology that openly describes Athens' rule as a tyranny and embraces it as such. Part of Cleon's speech was devoted to attacking those who would speak against him, maintaining that anyone who would speak on behalf of the Mytileneans must have been bribed. Certain elements of the speech evoke arguments made by Pericles in his famous funeral oration, and it is clear that Cleon, as portrayed by Thucydides, is deliberately laying claim to aspects of Pericles' mantle of leadership with his speech. In content, the speech emphasizes the favored status that Mytilene had held before the revolt, asserts that the city as a whole bears responsibility for the revolt, and argues that a favored city that revolts must be treated harshly so as to deter others from following.

After Cleon's speech, Thucydides presents a speech by Diodotus, a politician who appears only this once in recorded history, but who, Thucydides reports, had also spoken against Cleon's proposal the previous day. He is identified as "Diodotus, son of Eucrates"; the Eucrates in question is presumably a fairly prominent lieutenant of Pericles mentioned on several occasions before this. The early portion of Diodotus' speech is devoted to refuting the charges that Cleon had preemptively levelled against those who would speak after him, principally by arguing that the assembly would deprive itself of wise counsel if it constantly examined the motives of speakers instead of the arguments they presented. Next Diodotus attacks Cleon's claim that harshness would deter future revolts, on the grounds that no state revolts in the expectation of failure, and that the more useful countermeasure, therefore, is a mild punishment that will allow for reconsideration when the revolt appears likely to fail. Throughout the speech, Diodotus refuses to stray from the grounds of expediency, reminding the Athenians that they sit not as a court of law but as political assembly, dedicated to determining what action is most advantageous for Athens. On the issue of culpability, however, he flatly denies that the demos shares in the guilt of the oligarchs, and warns the assembly against alienating its potential friends throughout the empire.

After speeches on the motion concluded, the assembly voted, by a narrow margin, to overturn the previous day's decree. Cleon then put forward a second motion proposing the execution, without trial, of the 1,000 Lesbians whom Paches had selected out as most responsible for the rebellion; that motion was carried without recorded discussion. A ship was immediately dispatched to Mytilene to countermand the execution order sent out the previous day. The Mytilenean representatives in Athens offered a sizable reward to the crew if the ship arrived in time to prevent the executions. Rowing day and night, sleeping in shifts, and eating at their oars, the rowers of the second trireme managed to make up the first ship's one day lead and arrive at Mytilene just as Paches was reading the original order, in time to prevent its execution.

=== Modern analyses ===
==== Authenticity of the speeches ====
As with all the speeches reported by Thucydides, the resemblance between Cleon's and Diodotus' speeches as the historian recorded them and the speeches actually given has been the subject of much debate. In the famous passage where he lays out his methodology for reporting the content of speeches, Thucydides states that "my habit has been to make the speakers say what was in my opinion demanded of them by the various occasions, of course adhering as closely as possible to the general sense of what they really said." Various historians have either stressed the first clause of this sentence and reached the conclusion that Thucydides put words into his speakers' mouths or emphasized the second clause and concluded that Thucydides' speeches maintain the basic sense of the speeches actually given on the various occasions he describes. Still other scholars take the second approach but conclude that Thucydides strayed from this approach over his writing career; a number of schemes for dating the authorship of the various speeches has also been proposed, without any gaining a preponderance of support.

==== Popularity of the Athenian Empire ====
Diodotus' speech contains the famous claim that "in all the cities the people is your friend, and either does not revolt with the oligarchy, or, if forced to do so, becomes at once the enemy of the insurgents; so that in the war with the hostile city you have the masses on your side." Modern scholars have disagreed over whether this was actually the case. G.E.M. de Ste. Croix accepted Diodotus' statement as factual, and took the Mytilenean demos's threat to hand over the city as evidence that they had harbored secret pro-Athenian feelings throughout the siege. Some other scholars, meanwhile, have suggested that the threat was the action of men desperate because of hunger, but harboring no special regard for the Athenians. A third position is presented by Daniel Gillis, who observes that the Mytilenean demos would not necessarily have surrendered under less desperate circumstances, but was at least confident enough regarding its fate after a surrender to consider that action a viable alternative. Both Donald Kagan and Ronald Legon, meanwhile, have emphasized that, whatever the feelings of the Mytilenean demos were, the people had clearly not displayed enough revolutionary sentiment to prevent their rulers from distributing arms to them.

== Aftermath ==
Although Mytilene's citizens were spared execution, a harsh punishment was still imposed on the rebellious Lesbians. All the farmland on the island, save that belonging to the Methymnaeans, was confiscated and divided up into 3,000 lots, which were leased back to the Lesbians on a yearly basis. 300 of these lots were dedicated to the gods, and the 10 talents collected from them annually went into the Athenian treasury; the remainder supported a garrison of Athenian cleruchs. All Mytilene's possessions on the Ionian mainland were confiscated by Athens, its walls were pulled down, and its ships were confiscated. For the Athenians, this solution solved several problems; the garrison would provide security on Lesbos, and the absence of its members from Athens would to an extent ease the overpopulation of that city and the strain on the treasury resulting from the need to feed thousands of displaced farmers. The garrison returned home by the mid 420s BC, but apparently Athens was mistaken to think the island secure; in 412 BC, in the wake of the disaster in Syracuse, Lesbos was among the first islands to begin intriguing against the newly weakened Athenians.

In an anecdote that some have connected with the Mytilene affair, Plutarch reports that Paches killed himself during a trial at some point after his command at Mytilene. Donald Kagan has interpreted this anecdote to indicate that Paches, a moderate, was being prosecuted by Cleon or another more aggressive politician, who disapproved of his decision to break off the pursuit of Alcidas' fleet.

== Sources ==
=== Ancient ===
- Diodorus Siculus, Library
- Plutarch. "Nicias" . Lives. Translated by John Dryden – via Wikisource.
- Thucydides. History of the Peloponnesian War . Translated by Richard Crawley – via Wikisource.

=== Modern ===
- Andrewes, Arthur. "The Mytilene Debate: Thucydides 3.36-49". Phoenix, Vol. 16, No. 2. (Summer, 1962), pp. 64–85.
- Andrews, James A. "Cleon's Hidden Appeals: Thucydides 3.37-40". The Classical Quarterly, New Series, Vol. 50, No. 1. (2000), pp. 45–62.
- Gillis, Daniel. "The Revolt at Mytilene". The American Journal of Philology, Vol. 92, No. 1. (Jan., 1971), pp. 38–47.
- Kagan, Donald. The Peloponnesian War (Penguin Books, 2003). ISBN 0-670-03211-5
- Kagan, Donald. The Archidamian War (Cornell University Press, 1974) ISBN 0-8014-9714-0
- Legon, Ronald P. "Megara and Mytilene". Phoenix, Vol. 22, No. 3. (Autumn, 1968), pp. 200–225.
- Wasserman, Felix Martin. "Post-Periclean Democracy in Action: The Mytilenean Debate (Thuc. III 37-48)". Transactions and Proceedings of the American Philological Association, Vol. 87. (1956), pp. 27–41.
