= Abarnis =

Ancient Greek town on coast of Asia Minor

Coordinates: 40°22′42″N 26°44′04″E

Abarnis (Ancient Greek: Ἀβαρνίς), also known as Abarnias, Abarnos (Ἄβαρνος), and Aparnis (Ancient Greek: Ἀπαρνίς) was a coastal town in ancient Mysia, on a promontory of the same name. Xenophon speaks of the place as where Conon, during his engagements with Lysander, stole the sails of the Spartan fleet, reorganized his fleet and fled to refuge with Evagoras I, while dispatching the Paralus to Athens to bring news from the battles.

Its site is tentatively located near Çardak, Asiatic Turkey.
