= Crioa (Attica) =

Crioa or Krioa (Ancient Greek: Κριώα) was a deme in ancient Athens of the phyle of Antiochis, sending one delegate to the Athenian Boule until 307/6 BCE, and two delegates thereafter. Aristophanes cast a character, Euelpides, from Crioa in his play The Birds.

Its site is unlocated.
