= Nan Dunbar =

British classics academic (1928–2005)

- Born: 18 July 1928; Glasgow
- Died: 3 April 2005 (aged 76); Oxford

Academic background
- Education: Glasgow University; Girton College, Cambridge

Academic work
- Discipline: Classics
- Sub-discipline: Greek Literature
- Institutions: Somerville College, Oxford; Girton College, Cambridge; St Andrews University; Edinburgh University
- Notable works: Aristophanes: Birds (ed. 1995)

Nan Dunbar (18 July 1928 – 3 April 2005) was Fellow and Tutor in Classics at Somerville College, Oxford. She is known for her 1995 edition of Aristophanes' The Birds.

== Early life and education ==
Dunbar was born in Glasgow in 1928, where she attended Hutcheson's Girls School. She was the first in her family to attend university, graduating from the University of Glasgow with a first class honours degree and numerous awards including 'Most Distinguished Arts Graduate' in 1950. She then went on to study at Girton College, Cambridge, where she completed a second degree, achieving a first in both part of the Classical tripos.

== Career ==
Dunbar was appointed to a lectureship at the University of Edinburgh in 1952. Subsequently, she returned to Girton College, Cambridge, where she was a fellow and lecturer in Classics from 1952 to 1957. In 1957 she moved to the University of St Andrews, and in 1965 became a fellow of Somerville College, Oxford.

At Somerville, she was heavily involved with the running of the college, acting as the tutor for admissions and the steward of the college chapel, serving on the finance committee, and holding the office of Vice-Principal from 1983 until 1985. A portrait of her, bequeathed by her husband, is in the Somerville College Library. Somerville College also planted a Himalayan birch in its gardens in honour of Dunbar.

== Edition of Aristophanes' Birds ==
Dunbar took almost forty years to produce her "colossal" edition of Aristophanes' Birds with an introduction and commentary. It was finally published in 1995 to great acclaim. Her commentary is notable for its detailed discussion of the ornithological aspects of the play, reflecting detailed knowledge of modern ornithology.

An abridged edition for students was published by Oxford University Press in 1997.

== Selected publications ==
- 1970. 'Three Notes on Aristophanes.' The Classical Review, 20(3), 269-273. doi:10.1017/S0009840X00227030
- 1990. The ornithology of Aristophanes' Bird-Wall: Birds 1136-1157. in ed. E. M. Craik 'Owls to Athens: essays on classical subjects presented to Sir Kenneth Dover.' ISBN 9780198144786
- 1995. (ed.), Aristophanes: Birds. Oxford: Clarendon Press, ISBN 0198149344
