= Athenian sacred ships =

State triremes with religious functions in Athens

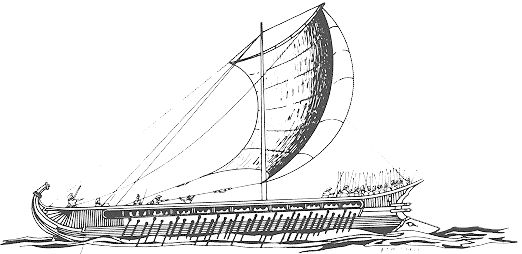
An ancient Greek trireme.

Athenian sacred ships were ancient Athenian ships, often triremes, which had special religious functions such as serving in sacred processions (theoria) or embassies or racing in boat races during religious festivals. The two most famous such ships were the Paralus and the Salaminia, which also served as the messenger ships of the Athenian government in the 5th and 4th centuries BC. Other notable ships included one possibly named the Delia (Δηλία), a triakonter (thirty-oared galley) believed to be the ship in which Theseus had sailed to Crete, and which was involved in several traditional theoria to Delos; the vessel was constantly repaired by replacing individual planks to keep it seaworthy while maintaining its identity as the same ship. (For the philosophical question of the ship's identity, see Ship of Theseus.) After the reforms of Cleisthenes, a ship was named for each of the ten tribes that political leader had created; these ships may also have been sacred ships. Another known sacred ship was the Theoris (θεωρίς), a trireme kept for sacred embassies.

Most probably the name of the ships derive from:

- Delia: was called like this because it was used (probably exclusively) for Delian theoriae
- Salaminia: was called like this because it was manned originally by natives of Salamis
- Paralus: was called like this because it was manned by sailors from the Paralia
- Theoris: from the term theori (θεωροί), who were sacred ambassadors or delegates and were dispatched on special missions (θεωρίαι) to carry out a religious task for the state, speak with an oracle, or represent the state at a religious celebration in another country.

The Paralus and the Salaminia, and possibly some other sacred ships, served in the Athenian combat fleet. Those two vessels, being particularly swift, were used as scout and messenger ships, but also fought in the line of battle. The Paralus and Salaminia, meanwhile, also performed various tasks for the government; the Paralus appears to have carried most diplomatic missions, and the Salaminia carried official state messages; most famously, it was sent to arrest Alcibiades while that politician was commanding the Sicilian Expedition. These two triremes also had dedicated treasurers, or tamiai.

== Sources ==
- Aristotle. Athenian Constitution . Translated by Frederic George Kenyon – via Wikisource.
- Jordan, Borimir, The Athenian Navy in the Classical Period. (Berkeley, University of California Press, 1975). ISBN 0-520-09482-4.
- Lewis, David M. "Book Review: The Athenian Navy in the Classical Period by Borimir Jordan". Classical Philology Vol. 73 No. 1 1978, pp. 70–72.
- Xenophon, A History of my Times
