= Salaminia =

Athenian navy vessel

The Salaminia (Greek: Σαλαμινία) was, along with Paralos, one of the two sacred triremes of the Athenian navy during the late 5th century BC. Frequently employed as a messenger ship, it played a notable role in several episodes of the Peloponnesian War.

The vessel was also used for special occasions, such as taking envoys to the oracle at Delphi and the conveyance of high-ranking Athenian statesmen. As such, only Athenian citizens were allowed to serve on it.
