= Diodotus (son of Eucrates) =

5th-century BC Athenian politician

Diodotus (Greek: Διόδοτος), son of Eucrates, was an opponent to the proposal of Cleon – leader of the radical, imperialist faction in Athens – in 427 BC to kill all adult Mytilenean males and to enslave their women and children after the defeat of Mytilene (see also Mytilenean revolt). He seems to represent the moderate faction in Athens (in favour of Pericles' policy).

Diodotus' proposal won in the assembly, so that in the end only Cleon's next proposal was carried out: to punish by death those Mytileneans who were sent by Paches to Athens (which were a little over a thousand; this was probably about 10% of the adult male population of the rebelling cities on Lesbos). The execution took place without proper trial.

Diodotus' one speech in Thucydides is all we know of him. His absence in the historical record has led some interpreters to speculate that he is Thucydides' invention. Proponents of this claim note that Thucydides claims in Bk. I to supply his own version of events in place of what actually happened.

== Notable quotations ==
"The good citizen ought to triumph not by frightening his opponents but by beating them fairly in argument" (3.42.5).

"All, states and individuals, are alike prone to error, and there is no law that will prevent them; or why should men have exhausted the list of punishments in search of enactments to protect them from evildoers?" (3.45.3).
