= Paralus (ship) =

Ancient Athenian sacred ship

The Paralus or Paralos (Greek: Πάραλος, "sea-side"; named after a mythological son of Poseidon), was an Athenian sacred ship and a messenger trireme of the Athenian navy during the late 5th century BC. Its crew were known for their vehement pro-democracy views. It played a notable role in several episodes of the Peloponnesian War.

The Paralus appears more often in the literary and epigraphical sources for the classical period than any other individual ship; it carried almost all recorded Athenian diplomatic missions in the 5th and 4th centuries, and it appears that on most of these missions the treasurer (tamias) of Paralus acted as the chief ambassador.

The crew of the Paralus (the Paraloi) was known for its exceptionally strong pro-democracy views; its remarkable unity on this matter may indicate that it was composed of the members of a single genos of the name Paraloi. This crew was instrumental in preventing an oligarchic coup at Samos in 411 BC. On bringing the news of this event to Athens, however, they found that a successful oligarchic coup had taken place there, and were interned; one crew member, escaping, brought the news of this event to the fleet at Samos, beginning the period of open division between the city and the fleet.

In 405 BC, the Paralus was one of ten ships that escaped from the Athenian disaster at Aegospotami with Conon; it was then dispatched to inform Athens of the defeat, its arrival setting off a citywide panic.

== See also ==
- Salaminia

== Other sources ==
- Kagan, Donald. The Peloponnesian War (Penguin Books, 2003). ISBN 0-670-03211-5
- Jordan, Borimir, The Athenian Navy in the Classical Period. (Berkeley, University of California Press, 1975) ISBN 0-520-09482-4
- Xenophon, Hellenica
